= Monongahela =

Monongahela or Mon Valley may refer to:

== Places ==
- Monongahela, Pennsylvania, a city in Washington County
  - Monongahela Cemetery, a historic cemetery in Monongahela City, Pennsylvania
  - Monongahela City Bridge, spans the Monongahela River
- Monongahela Township, a rural township in Greene County, Pennsylvania
- Monongahela National Forest, a national forest in eastern West Virginia
- Monongahela River, a tributary of the Ohio River
  - Battle of the Monongahela (9 July 1755), at the beginning of the French and Indian War
- Lake Monongahela, former Proglacial lake in Pennsylvania, West Virginia, and Ohio
- Monongahela Formation, a geologic group

== Railways ==
- Monongahela Railway, a coal-hauling short line railroad in Pennsylvania and West Virginia in the United States
- Monongahela Connecting Railroad, a small industrial railroad in Pittsburgh, Pennsylvania
- Monongahela Freight Incline, a funicular railway that scaled Mount Washington
- Monongahela Incline, a funicular located near the Smithfield Street Bridge in Pittsburgh, Pennsylvania

== Other ==
- Monongahela (album), a 1988 album by The Oak Ridge Boys
- Monongahela (fish), a genus of prehistoric fish
- Monongahela virus, an Orthohantavirus
- Monongahela culture, a Native American group
- USS Monongahela, one of various ships of the United States Navy
- the Mon Valley, a variant name of the PATrain commuter rail service
- Monongahela, a whaleship lost in 1853.
