= Caroline Endres Diescher =

American engineer

- Born: Caroline Endres; February 1846; Cincinnati, Ohio
- Died: February 7, 1930 (aged 83–84); Pittsburgh, Pennsylvania, U.S.
- Resting place: Allegheny Cemetery
- Other name: Carrie E. Diescher
- Occupation: Engineer
- Known for: Incline design
- Spouse: Samuel S. Diescher (m. 1872; died 1915)
- Parent: John Endres

Caroline Endres Diescher (February 1846 – February 7, 1930), also known as Caroline Endres, was notable as one of the first female engineers in the United States. With her father John Endres, who was born and educated in Prussia, she designed two inclines in the Pittsburgh area: the Monongahela Incline and the Mount Oliver Incline, which opened in 1870 and 1871, respectively.

== Life ==
Born in Cincinnati, Ohio in February 1846, Caroline Endres was a daughter of Prussian-born engineer John Endres and his wife, and called "Carrie," (at least on one census.) She was educated in Europe and trained further by her father as an engineer after her return.

She assisted him with his design of the Pittsburgh area's first passenger incline, the Monongahela Incline, which launched in 1870. The next year, she helped him design the Mount Oliver Incline.

In 1872 Caroline Endres married Hungarian-born engineer Samuel Diescher (1839-1915), who had assisted her father on the incline project. He had immigrated to the United States (US) in 1866, settling first in Cincinnati. Six years later he designed the Duquesne Incline in Pittsburgh and, ultimately, the majority of inclines in the US, as well as numerous industrial projects related to coal and steel production, and highway and infrastructure projects.

Their wedding was held at the St. Paul German Evangelical Church in Cincinnati. They lived on Mount Washington in Pittsburgh and had six children together. Their three sons, Samuel E., August P. and Alfred J. Diescher, all became engineers and in 1901 their father set up a business: S. Diescher and Sons. The couple also had three daughters, Irene E., Carrie L., and Irma J. Diescher.

== Death and interment ==
Diescher died in Pittsburgh, Pennsylvania in 1930 at the age of 84. She was interred at the Allegheny Cemetery, where her husband had been buried.
