= Troy Hill =

Troy Hill may refer to:

- Troy Hill (American football) (born 1991), NFL cornerback
- Troy Hill (Pittsburgh), a neighborhood in Pittsburgh
  - Troy Hill Incline, a funicular railway

== See also ==
- Parsippany-Troy Hills, New Jersey, a township
