= Samuel Diescher =

American civil engineer (1839–1915)

- Born: June 25, 1839; Budapest, Hungary
- Died: December 24, 1915 (aged 76); Pittsburgh, Pennsylvania, U.S.
- Resting place: Allegheny Cemetery
- Education: Karlsruhe Polytechnique and University of Zurich
- Occupations: Civil and mechanical engineer
- Years active: 1866-1908
- Known for: Inclines, industrial projects, machinery for the Ferris wheel
- Spouse: Caroline Endres (m. 1872)
- Children: Three sons and three daughters
- Relatives: John Endres, father-in-law

Samuel Diescher (June 25, 1839 – December 24, 1915) was a prominent Hungarian-American civil and mechanical engineer who had his career in the United States. After being educated at universities in Karlsruhe and Zurich in Europe, he immigrated to the United States in 1866 and settled in Cincinnati, Ohio. There he supervised construction of his first inclined plane. He later moved to Pittsburgh, Pennsylvania, where he worked with John Endres on the Monongahela Incline (1870), the first passenger incline in the city.

Diescher designed the Duquesne Incline (1877). He is believed to have designed the majority of inclined planes in the United States, including numerous projects in Pennsylvania. He also designed a wide range of industrial projects, particularly those related to the coal and steel industries. His three sons also became engineers and in 1901 he set up a business with them: S. Diescher and Sons. These two early inclines in Pittsburgh are the only passenger inclines still in use there. Both are listed on the National Register of Historic Places and, in 1977, were also designated as Historic Mechanical Engineering Landmarks by the American Society of Mechanical Engineers.

== Biography ==
Born in Budapest, Diescher was educated at Karlsruhe Polytechnique and the University of Zurich. Emigrating to the United States in 1866, he settled in Cincinnati, where he built his first inclined plane and met John Endres, a Prussian-born engineer.

He moved to Pittsburgh to work with Endres on the Monongahela Incline, the first passenger incline in the city. The chief engineer was assisted by his daughter, Caroline Endres, who had been educated in Europe and also trained as an engineer.

In 1872, Diescher married Caroline Endres at the St. Paul German Evangelical Church in Cincinnati, Ohio. She was one of the first female engineers in the United States. The young couple made their home on Mount Washington in Pittsburgh and had six children together: sons Samuel E., August P. and Alfred J. Diescher, who all became engineers. The couple also had three daughters, Irene E., Carrie L., and Irma J. Diescher. In 1901 the father set up a business for him and his sons: S. Diescher and Sons.

Diescher designed a range of water works, industrial buildings and plants, coal handling equipment, furnaces for the steel industry, and miscellaneous machinery for tasks ranging from soap making to steel fabrication to sugar beet processing.

He designed the majority of inclined planes in the United States, including numerous inclines in Pittsburgh and southwestern Pennsylvania. The most notable of these is the Duquesne Incline, which has become a popular tourist attraction in the city of Pittsburgh. Other works attributed to him include the Castle Shannon Incline, the Castle Shannon South Incline, Penn Incline, Fort Pitt Incline, Troy Hill Incline (more probably designed by Gustav Lindenthal), Nunnery Hill Incline, Clifton Incline, Ridgewood Incline (alternatively credited to J. Ford Mackenzie) and the Johnstown Inclined Plane.

He also designed and built inclines in Wheeling, West Virginia; Cleveland, Ohio; Duluth, Minnesota; Orange, New Jersey; Hamilton, Ontario, Canada; and Girardot and Camboa, Colombia. He was the chief engineer for the Pittsburgh and Castle Shannon Railroad.

Working with George Ferris, Diescher designed the machinery for the Ferris wheel at the 1893 Columbian Exposition in Chicago, which became one of its most famous attractions. He also designed an energy generating plant for the U. S. Wave Power Company in Atlantic City, New Jersey.

He was active in highway engineering and street-railway construction. Diescher was also well known for designing and building coal-washing plants, coke works, water works, machine shops, and rolling mills.

Diescher retired in 1908 and died on December 24, 1915, survived by his wife Caroline and other family. He was buried at Allegheny Cemetery, where his wife was also later interred.
