= National Engineering Landmark =

A National Engineering Landmark may refer to:

- a National Historic Engineering Landmark (disambiguation) from the USA
- a kind of Engineering Heritage Marker awarded by Engineers Australia before 2008.

== See also ==
- Category:Recipients of Engineers Australia engineering heritage markers
