= List of inclines in Pittsburgh =

Inclined railways located in Pittsburgh, Pennsylvania

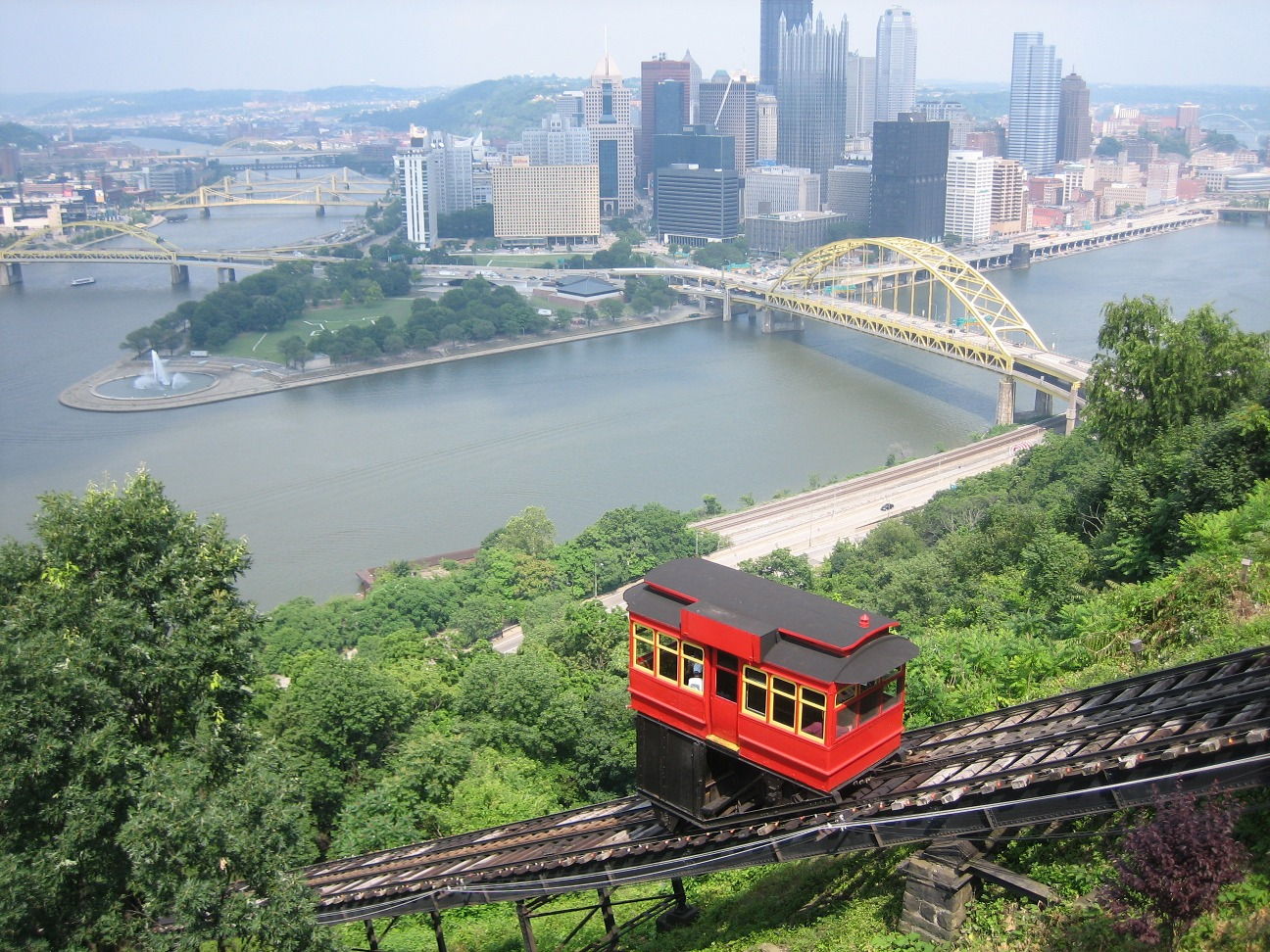
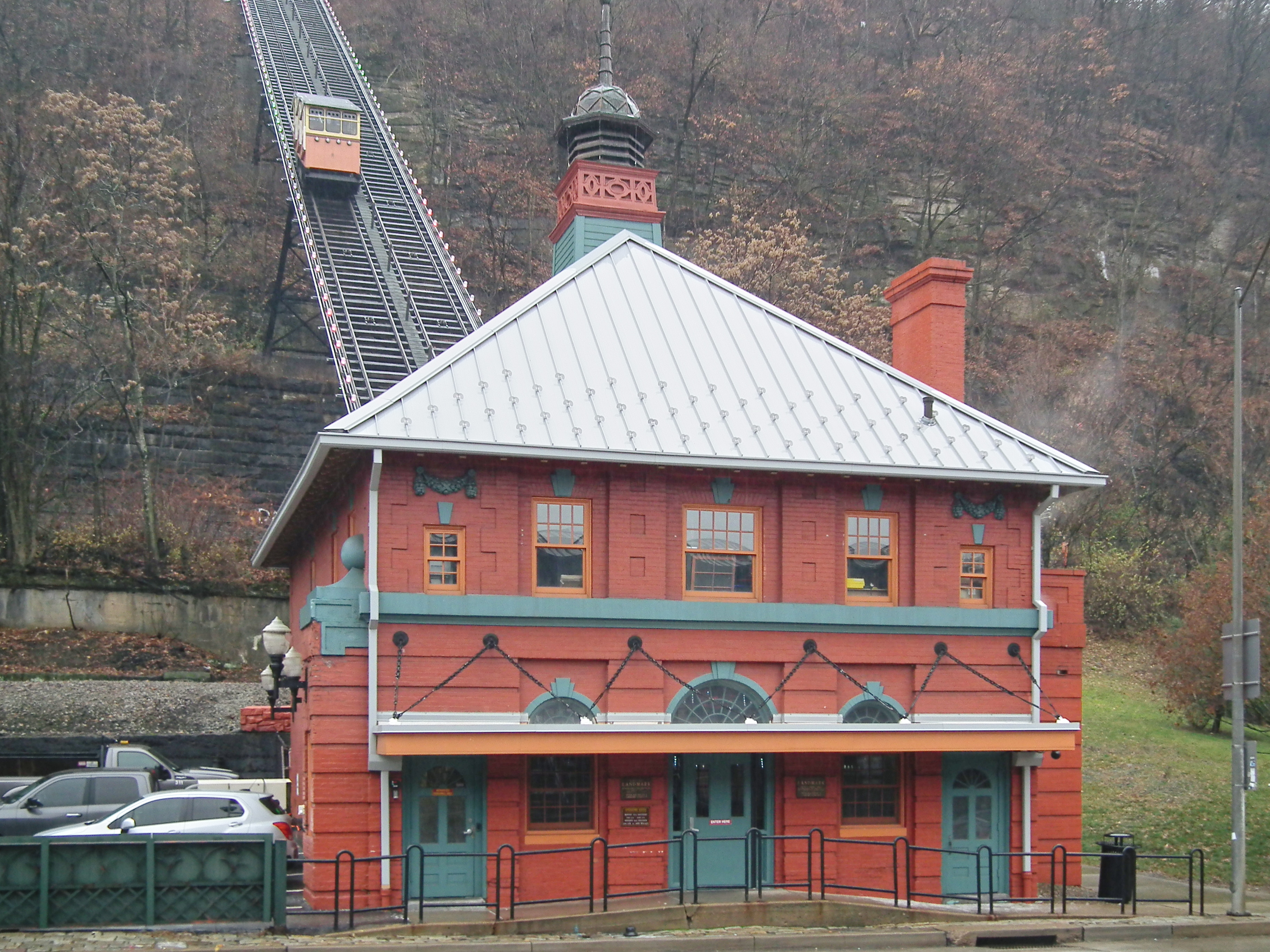
The two still active inclines: Duquesne (left) and Monongahela (right)

Beginning in 1870, the city of Pittsburgh, Pennsylvania built numerous inclined railways to provide passenger service to workers traveling the steep hills to their homes; there were 17 built in the late 19th century. Following road building and greater use of private automobiles, the inclines business declined and most were closed and removed.

The Monongahela Incline, the first built in the city, and the Duquesne Incline are the only two still operating. They carry passengers between Mount Washington and the lowlands along the Monongahela River. They are each listed on the National Register of Historic Places and, in 1977, both were recognized as Historic Mechanical Engineering Landmarks by the American Society of Mechanical Engineers (ASME).

Name	Opened	Closed	Lower end	Upper end	Owner
Duquesne Incline	1877	—	South Shore: Carson Street	Mount Washington: Grandview Avenue near Oneida Street	Duquesne Incline Plane Company; Now Society for the Preservation of the Duquesne Heights Incline
Monongahela Incline	1870	—	South Shore: Carson Street near Smithfield Street Bridge	Mount Washington: Grandview Avenue near Wyoming Street	Monongahela Incline Plane Company; Now Port Authority of Allegheny County
Bellevue Incline	1887	1889	Near Bellevue, PA Railroad Station @ Ohio River	Intersection of Sherman Ave. & Lincoln Ave.	Bellevue and Davis Island Incline Plane Company
Castle Shannon Incline	1890	1964	South Shore: Carson Street near Arlington Avenue	Mount Washington: Bailey Avenue near Haberman Avenue	Pittsburgh Railways (Pittsburgh and Castle Shannon Railroad)
Castle Shannon Incline No. 2	1892	1914	Mount Washington: Warrington Avenue west of Haberman Avenue	Mount Washington: Bailey Avenue west of Haberman Avenue	Pittsburgh Railways (Pittsburgh and Castle Shannon Railroad)
Clifton Incline	1889	1905	Perry Hilltop: Strauss Street near Metcalf Street	Perry Hilltop: Irwin Avenue near Chautauqua Street	Clifton Avenue Incline Plane Company
Fort Pitt Incline	1882	1900	Bluff: Second Avenue near Tenth Street Bridge	Bluff: Bluff Street near Magee Street	Fort Pitt Incline Plane Company
Knoxville Incline	1890	1960	South Side Flats: Bradish Street between 11th and 12th streets	Allentown: Brosville Street near Warrington Avenue	Pittsburgh Railways (Pittsburgh Incline Plane Company)
Monongahela Freight Incline	1884	1935	South Shore: Carson Street near Smithfield Street Bridge	Mount Washington: Grandview Avenue near Wyoming Street	Monongahela Incline Plane Company; Now Port Authority of Allegheny County
Pittsburgh and Castle Shannon Plane	before 1864	c. 1912	Carson Street	Bailey	Pittsburgh Coal Company
Mount Oliver Incline	1872	1951	South Side Flats: Freyburg Street near 12th Street	South Side Slopes: Warrington Avenue near Mount Oliver Street	Pittsburgh Railways (Mount Oliver Incline Railway)
Norwood Incline	1901	1923	Island Avenue	Norwood Place	
Nunnery Hill Incline	1888	1895	Fineview: Federal Street near Henderson Street	Fineview: Meadville Street near Catoma Street	Nunnery Hill Incline Plane Company
Penn Incline	1884	1953	Strip District: Spring Way near 17th Street	Hill District: Arcena Street near Ledlie Street	Pittsburgh Railways (Seventeenth Street Incline Plane Company)
Ridgewood Incline	1886	1887	Perry Hilltop: North Charles Street near Nublock Street	Perry Hilltop: Yale Street near Ridgewood Street	Ridgewood Incline Plane Company
St. Clair Incline	1888	c. 1932	South Side Flats: Josephine Street near Greeley Street	South Side Slopes: Salisbury Street between Fernleaf and Sterling Streets	St. Clair Incline Plane Company
Troy Hill Incline	1888	1898	Troy Hill: Ohio Street	Troy Hill: Lowrie Street near Froman Street	Troy Hill Incline Plane Company

Dimensional comparison

== See also ==
- H.B. Hays and Brothers Coal Railroad
