= Fort Pitt Incline =

Former funicular in Pittsburgh, Pennsylvania

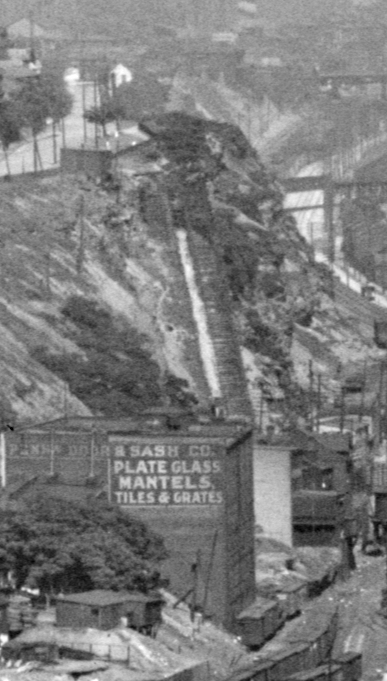
- Remains of incline circa 1905

Overview
- Status: Ceased operation
- Locale: Pittsburgh, PA
- Coordinates: 40.4347°N 79.9892°W
- Termini: 2nd Avenue; Bluff Street
- Stations: 2

Service
- Type: Funicular

History
- Opened: 1882
- Closed: 1900

Technical
- Line length: 350 feet (107 m)
- Track gauge: 10 ft (3,048 mm)
- Highest elevation: 135 feet (41 m)

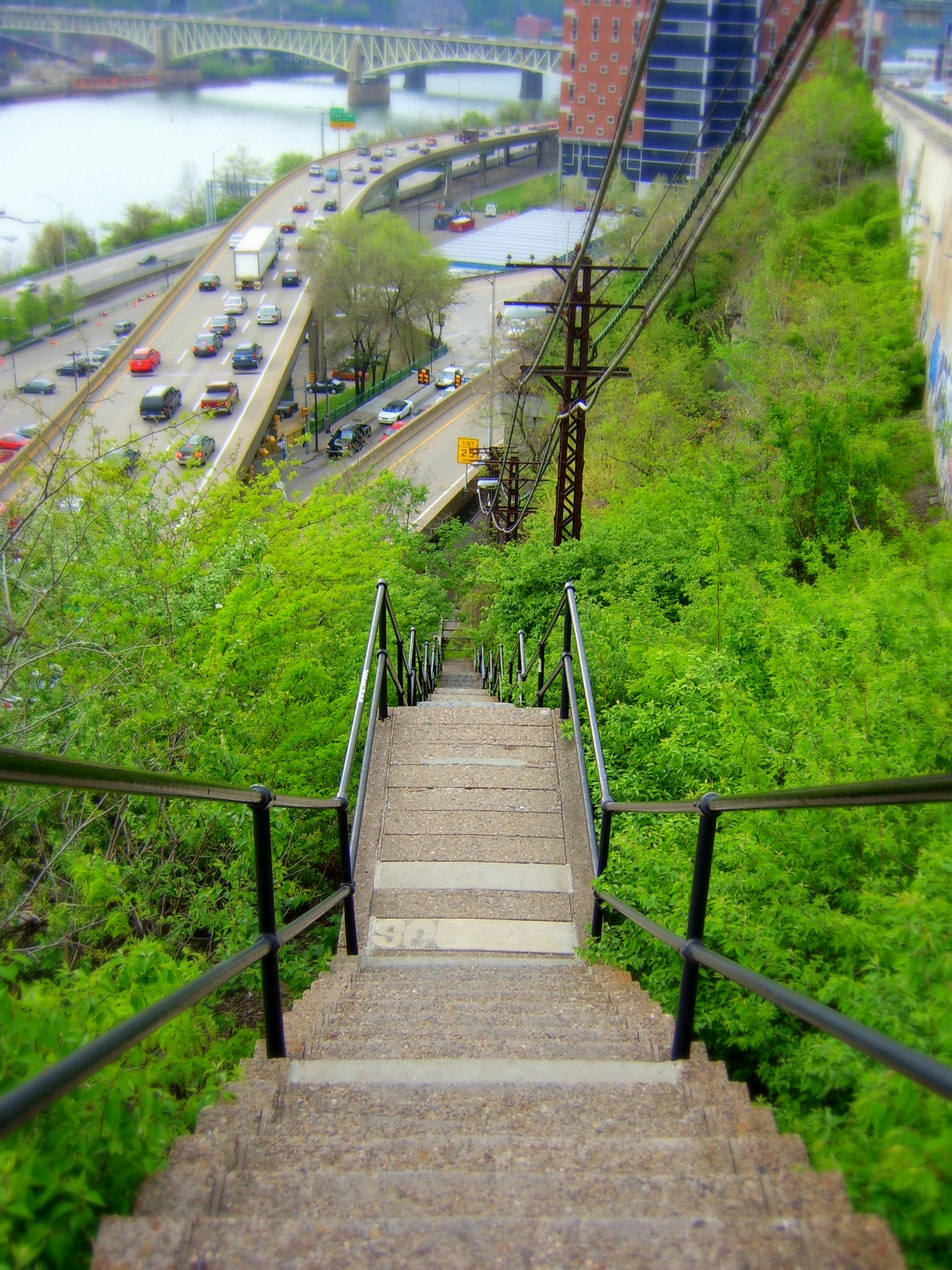
Steps along former incline course

The Fort Pitt Incline was a 10 ft (3,048 mm) gauge funicular railroad in the Bluff neighborhood of Pittsburgh. Opened in 1882, the incline ran from 2nd Avenue to Bluff Street, a distance of 350 feet (107 m), and a vertical distance of 135 feet (41 m). The designer was Samuel Diescher.

The incline was abandoned on November 7, 1900, and afterward sat idle for about three years before fire destroyed it.

Marking the former path of the incline are public steps which ascend from the south portal of the Armstrong Tunnel (at the South Tenth Street Bridge) to the Boulevard of the Allies next to the Duquesne University campus.

== See also ==
- List of funicular railways
- List of inclines in Pittsburgh
