= Monongahela Freight Incline =

Coordinates: 40.431944°N 80.005556°W

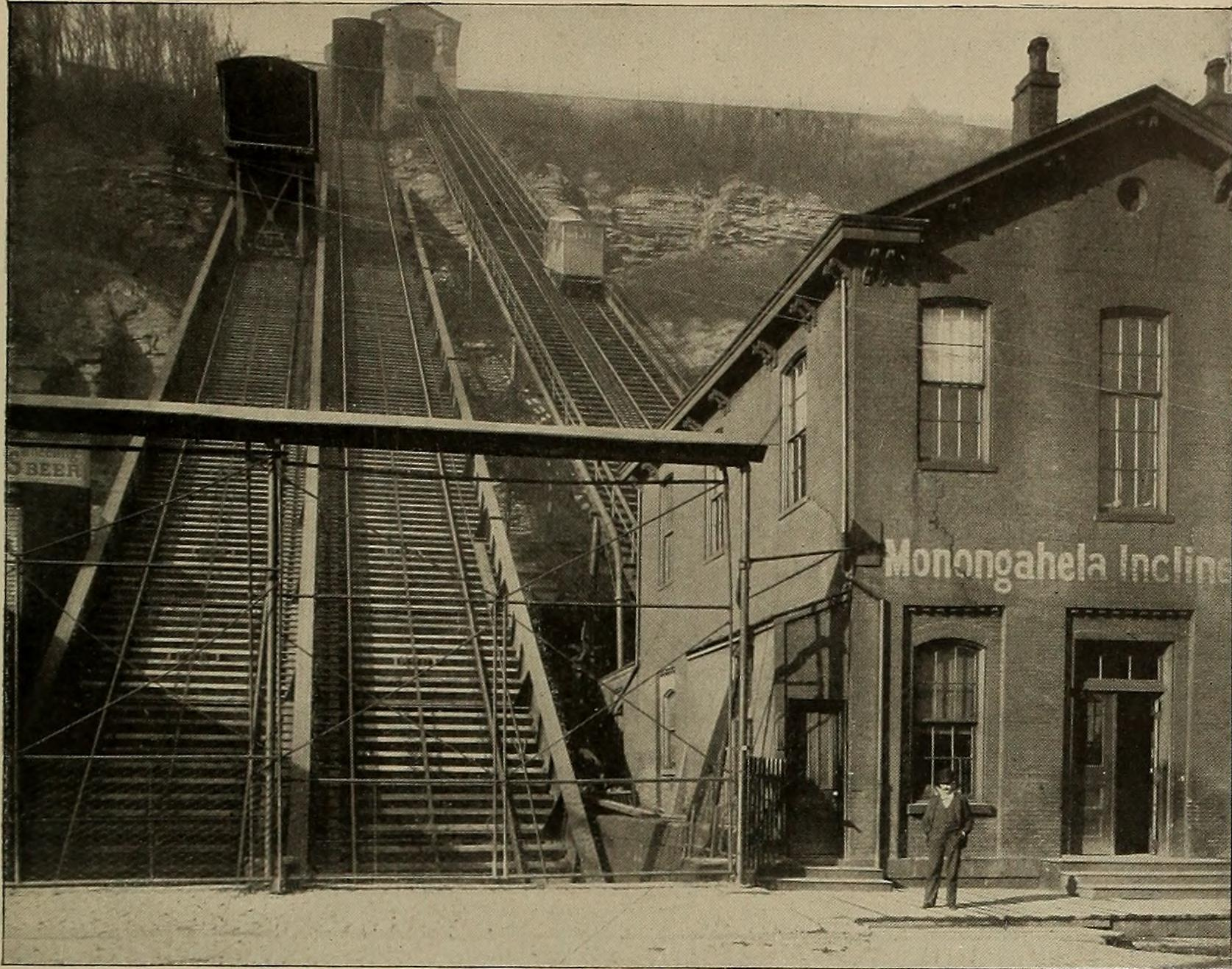

Overview
- Headquarters: Pittsburgh, Pennsylvania
- Locale: Pittsburgh, Pennsylvania
- Dates of operation: 1884–1935

Technical
- Track gauge: 10 ft (3,048 mm)

The Monongahela Freight Incline was a funicular railway that scaled Mount Washington in Pittsburgh, Pennsylvania, United States.

== History and features ==
Designed by European immigrants Samuel Diescher and John Endres, this incline was built beside the smaller, original Monongahela Incline and opened in 1884. The incline cost $125,000.

It had a unique 10 ft (3,048 mm) broad gauge that would allow vehicles, as well as walk-on passengers, to ascend and descend the hill. The cars were hoisted by a pair of Robinson & Rea engines.

The incline operated until 1935.

The older passenger incline, which was built in 1870, is one of two inclines still serving South Side Pittsburgh today, out of a total of seventeen that were built during the nineteenth century. Passengers can see concrete pylons remaining from the freight incline during the descent.

== See also ==
- List of funicular railways
- List of inclines in Pittsburgh

== Sources ==
- A Century of Inclines, The Society for the Preservation of the Duquesne Incline.
