= National Historic Engineering Landmark =

National Historic Engineering Landmark may refer to landmarks on the following lists:

- List of Historic Civil Engineering Landmarks
- List of Historic Mechanical Engineering Landmarks
