= Penn Incline =

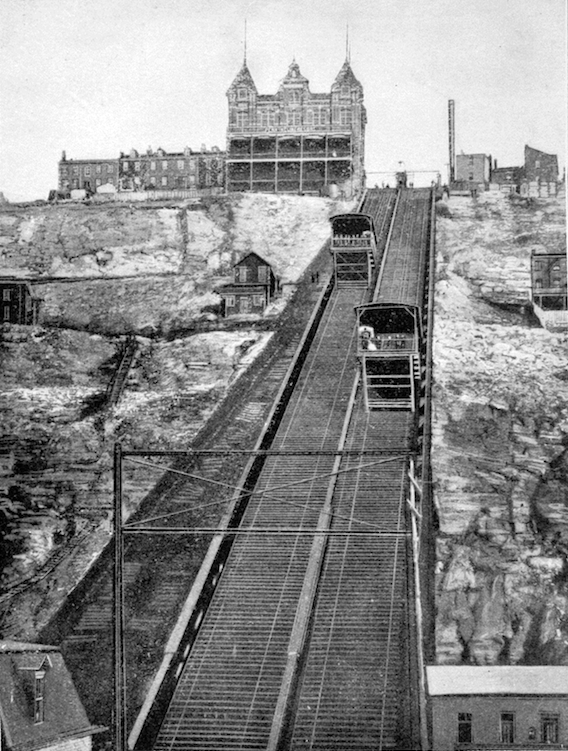
- Penn Incline and resort, c. 1889

Overview
- Other name(s): 17th Street Incline
- Status: Dismantled
- Locale: Pittsburgh, Pennsylvania
- Coordinates: 40.4484°N 79.9849°W
- Termini: 17th Street, Strip District; Arcena Street, Hill District

Service
- Type: Funicular
- Operator(s): Penn Incline Plane Co. (1884–1904); Pittsburgh Railways (1904–1953)

History
- Opened: 1 March 1884
- Closed: 30 November 1953

Technical
- Line length: 840 feet (260 m)
- Number of tracks: 2
- Track gauge: 10 ft (3,048 mm)

The Penn Incline, also known as the 17th Street Incline, was a funicular railroad that ran between the Strip and Hill districts in Pittsburgh, Pennsylvania. It operated from 1884 to 1953.

== Description ==
The incline ascended from 17th Street between Liberty and Penn avenues in the Strip District to Arcena (Ridgeway) Street near Ledlie Street in the Hill District. It measured 840 feet in length with a vertical rise of 330 feet. It was structurally massive, with over 750 tons of bridge work carrying the two 10-foot-gauge tracks over the Pennsylvania Railroad yards, Bigelow Boulevard, and Liberty Avenue. A writer in the Street Railway Journal in 1891 believed that it was "probably the most heavily built plane in existence".

== History ==
The incline was built to the design of Samuel Diescher with the aim of hoisting 20-ton coal loads to the top of the hill. It entered service on 1 March 1884. While the coal traffic never materialized to expectations, railroad and business activity in the Strip District generated enough passengers and freight to keep the incline operating. Customers included produce merchants transporting their goods from wholesale markets in the Strip.

A saloon and entertainment hall called the Penn Incline Resort existed for several years next to the upper landing. This resort, patterned after similar hilltop attractions in Cincinnati, was built together with the incline to boost business. It enjoyed early popularity and according to The Pittsburg Dispatch was "a favorite resort for the better class of Germans". With the implementation in 1888 of Pennsylvania's Brooks High License Law, the resort stopped selling liquor and went into decline. The building was destroyed in 1892 by a fire that spread from the incline's boiler house.

In 1927, a stunt driver guided a Willys–Overland Whippet automobile up and down the incline in a promotional spectacle to demonstrate the car's climbing and braking prowess. A plankway specially built for the occasion prevented the car's wheels from lodging between the rail ties.

By the end of World War II, business was struggling. The incline was open only three hours in the morning and four hours in the afternoon when its last owner, Pittsburgh Railways, asked the state Public Utilities Commission permission to abandon it. Nobody opposed the request. The incline shut down on 30 November 1953 and within the next three years was dismantled.

There has been talk among city planners of reviving the incline, but no such idea has come to fruition. In 2020, mayor Bill Peduto suggested relinking the Strip and Hill districts with a gondola lift that could also extend to the Oakland neighborhood.

== See also ==
- List of funicular railways
- List of inclines in Pittsburgh
