= John Endres =

- Born: John J. Endres; Prussia
- Occupation: civil engineer
- Years active: 1869-1883
- Known for: Inclines
- Children: Caroline Endres Diescher

John J. Endres was a civil engineer known for designing the Monongahela Incline, the first passenger incline in the United States, in Pittsburgh, Pennsylvania. The incline was originally steam powered and ran on wooden tracks. Born in Prussia and educated in Europe, Endres had immigrated to the United States and settled in Cincinnati, Ohio. His daughter, Caroline Endres, born and educated in the US, became one of the first women engineers in the country. She assisted him on the Monongahela Incline.

While the two were working in Pittsburgh, they met fellow engineer Samuel Diescher, who was born in Hungary and had immigrated to the US in 1866. Diescher and John Endres became friends and business partners. Samuel and Caroline married in 1872, and resided in Pittsburgh. They had six children together, including three sons who became engineers and went into business with their father.

Endres returned to Cincinnati after constructing the Monongahela Incline. He returned to Pittsburgh in 1883 to help Diescher design the Monongahela Freight Incline, completed the following year.
