= B. F. Clyde's Cider Mill =

Oldest continuous producer of hard cider in the United States

B.F. Clyde's Cider Mill
- Location: Mystic, Connecticut
- Coordinates: 41°23′57″N 71°57′14″W

Construction
- Completed: 1898

B.F. Clyde's Cider Mill is a historic cider mill located in Mystic, Connecticut. It is the only surviving steam-powered cider mill in the United States, and the oldest continuous producer of hard cider in the United States.

== History ==
Benjamin F. Clyde began selling apple cider in 1881, but he had it pressed at other mills. He purchased his own mill in 1897, which was installed in 1898. It has all steel construction and has one of the final screw presses.

Since then, ownership of the mill has passed from generation to generation within the family, spanning six generations. Visiting the mill is a local tradition.

It was listed as a Historic Mechanical Engineering Landmark by the American Society of Mechanical Engineers in 1994.
