= Duquesne Incline =

Funicular in Pittsburgh, Pennsylvania

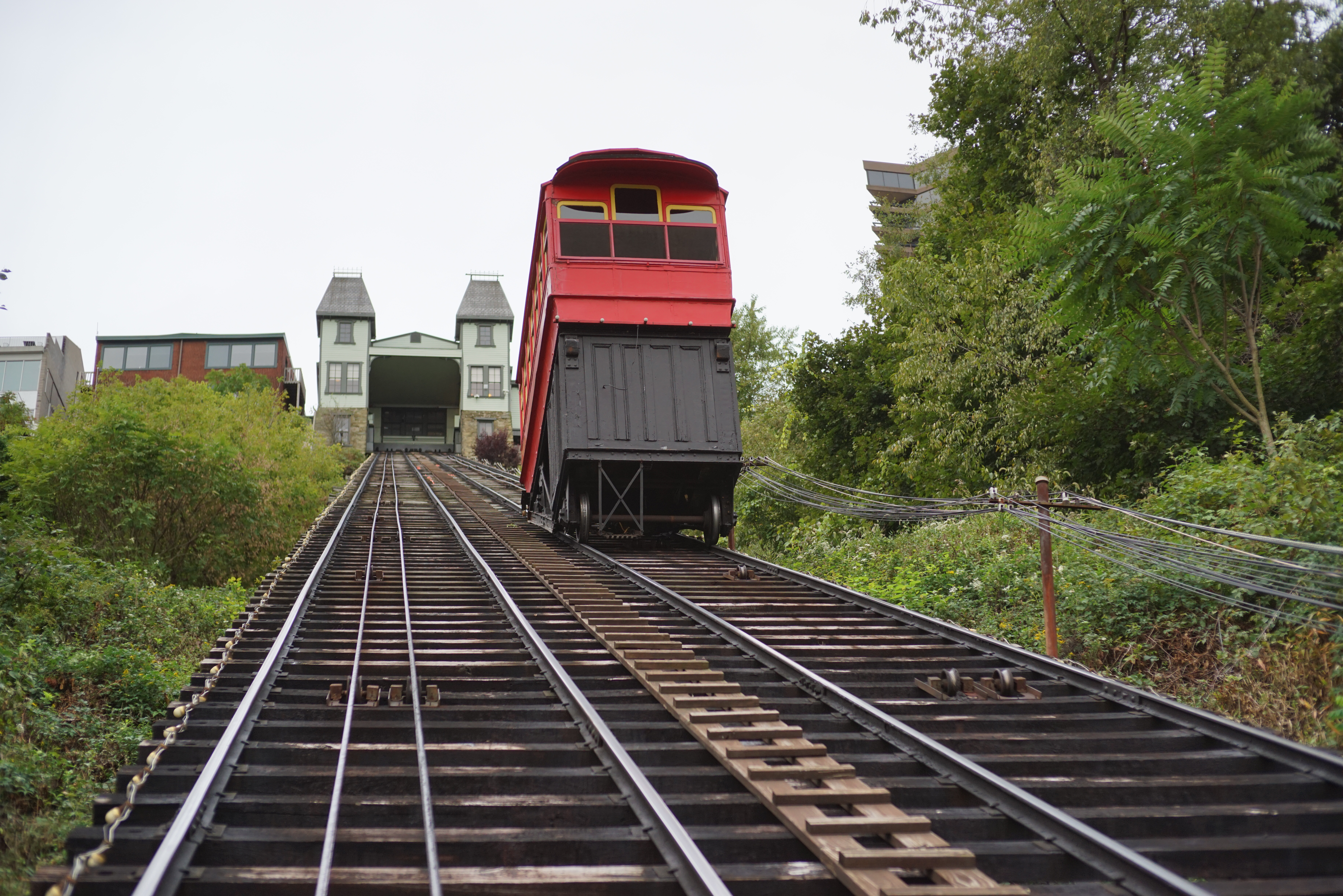
- View of the incline from below, with the upper station in the background

Overview
- Owner: Pittsburgh Regional Transit
- Locale: Pittsburgh, Pennsylvania
- Website: www.duquesneincline.org

Service
- Type: Funicular
- Operator: Society for the Preservation of The Duquesne Heights Incline

History
- Opened: May 17, 1877

Technical
- Line length: 800 feet (244 m)
- Track gauge: 5 ft (1,524 mm)
- Maximum incline: 30 degrees
- Duquesne Incline
- U.S. National Register of Historic Places
- Pittsburgh Landmark – PHLF
- Location within Pittsburgh Location within Pennsylvania Location within the United States
- Coordinates: 40°26′21″N 80°1′5″W
- Built: 1877
- Architect: Samuel Diescher
- Architectural style: Second Empire, T pattern
- NRHP reference No.: 75001609
- Added to NRHP: March 4, 1975

The Duquesne Incline (/djuːˈkeɪn/ dew-KAYN) is a funicular scaling Mount Washington near the South Side neighborhood of Pittsburgh, Pennsylvania, United States.

The lower station is in the Second Empire style. Together with the incline, which rises 400 feet (122 m) in height, at a 30-degree angle, it was listed on the National Register of Historic Places in 1975. The incline is unusual for using a 5 ft (1,524 mm) track gauge, mainly used in Finland, Russia, and Mongolia.

Together with the Monongahela Incline, it is one of two passenger inclines still in operation on Pittsburgh's South Side. By 1977, the two had become tourist attractions and together served more than one million commuters and tourists annually. That year both inclines were designated as Historic Mechanical Engineering Landmarks by the American Society of Mechanical Engineers (ASME).

The incline is owned by Pittsburgh Regional Transit, and operated by the nonprofit Society for the Preservation of The Duquesne Heights Incline. Fares for the incline are standard Pittsburgh Regional Transit fares.

== History ==
Originally steam powered, the Duquesne Incline was designed by Samuel Diescher, a Hungarian-American civil engineer based in Pittsburgh, and completed in 1877. The incline is 800 feet (244 m) long, 400 feet (122 m) in height, and is inclined at a 30-degree angle. Its track gauge is 5 ft (1,524 mm), which is unusual in the United States (but standard in Finland, Russia, and Mongolia).

Diescher is known for having designed the majority of inclines in the United States, including several in Pittsburgh and Pennsylvania, in addition to numerous other industrial and highway projects.

The incline was intended to carry cargo up and down Mt. Washington in the late 19th century. It later carried passengers, particularly Mt. Washington residents who were tired of walking up the steep footpaths to the top of the bluff. Inclines were being built all over Mt. Washington to serve working-class people who were forced out of the lowlying riverfront by industrial development.

But as more roads were built in the twentieth century on "Coal Hill", as it was known, and automobile use increased, most of the other inclines were closed. By the end of the 1960s, only the Monongahela Incline and the Duquesne Incline remained in operation.

In 1962, the Duquesne Incline was closed, apparently for good. Major repairs were needed, and with so few patrons, the incline's private owners did little. But local Duquesne Heights residents launched a fund-raiser to help restore the incline. It was a huge success, and on July 1, 1963, the incline reopened under the auspices of a non-profit organization dedicated to its preservation.

The incline has since been totally refurbished. The cars, built by the J. G. Brill and Company of Philadelphia, have been stripped of paint to reveal the original wood. An observation deck was added at the top affording a view of Pittsburgh's "Golden Triangle". The Duquesne Incline is now one of the city's most popular tourist attractions. In 1975 it was listed on the National Register of Historic Places. By 1977 the two remaining passenger inclines served more than one million commuters and tourists annually. That year both inclines were designated as Historic Mechanical Engineering Landmarks by the American Society of Mechanical Engineers (ASME).

== Specifications ==
- Length: 793 feet (242 m)
- Elevation: 400 feet (122 m)
- Grade: 30 degrees
- Gauge: 5 ft (1,524 mm) broad gauge
- Speed: 4.03 mph (6.49 km/h)
- Passenger Capacity: 18 to 25 (one compartment)
- Opened: May 20, 1877
- Renovated: 1888 (with steel structure)
- Rebuilt: Original steam power replaced with electricity: 1935
- Renovated: Historic cars restored in 1970s

== In popular culture ==
- The incline is featured in the opening scene of The Next Three Days (2010) trailer. The same scene is featured about halfway through the film.
- It is also featured in the 1983 film Flashdance, set in Pittsburgh.
- In the 1987 movie Lady Beware, the characters played by Diane Lane and Cotter Smith ride the incline.
- The Duquesne Incline is a featured Pittsburgh landmark on Yinztagram.

== Gallery ==
Lower building

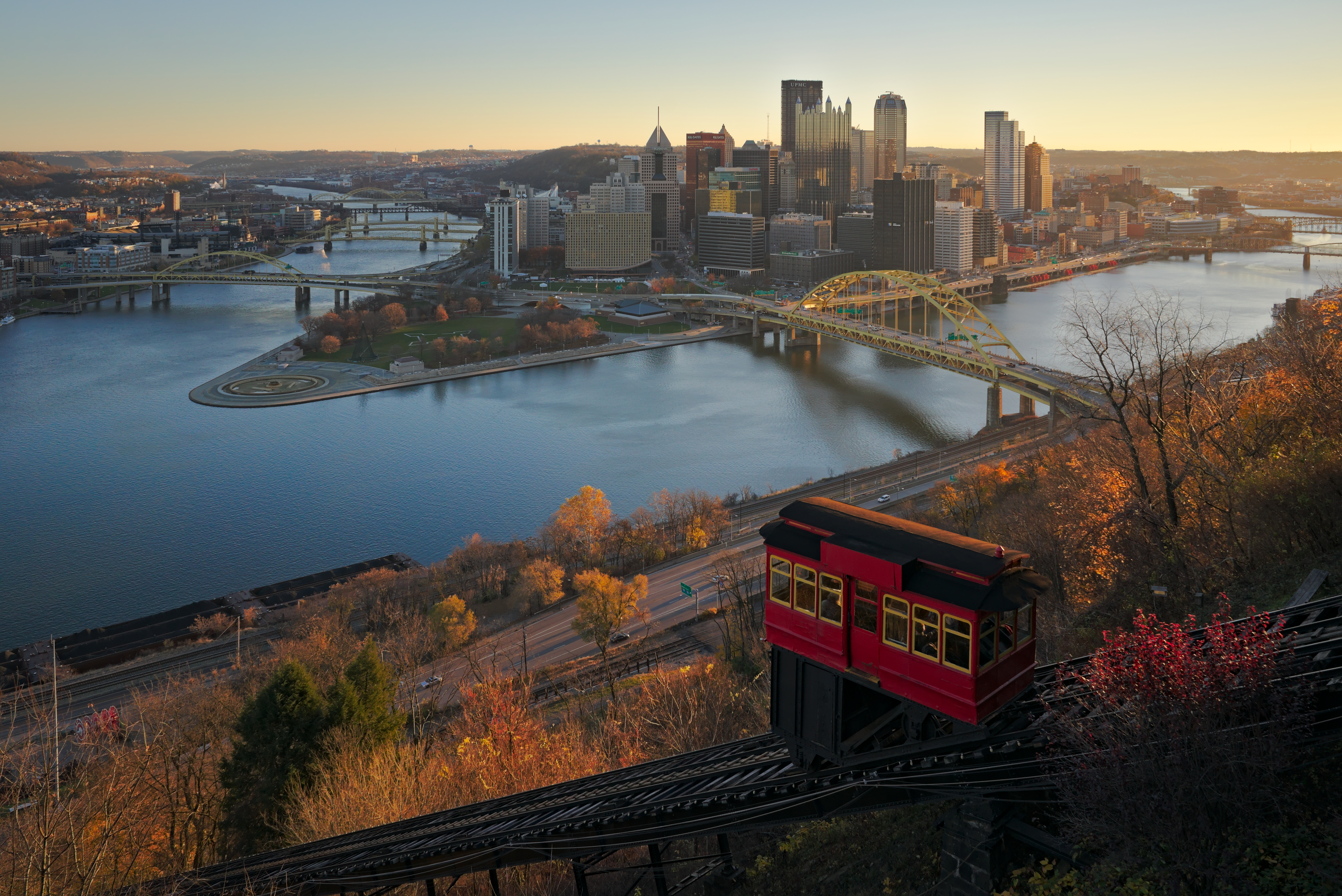
The incline preceding the Pittsburgh skyline

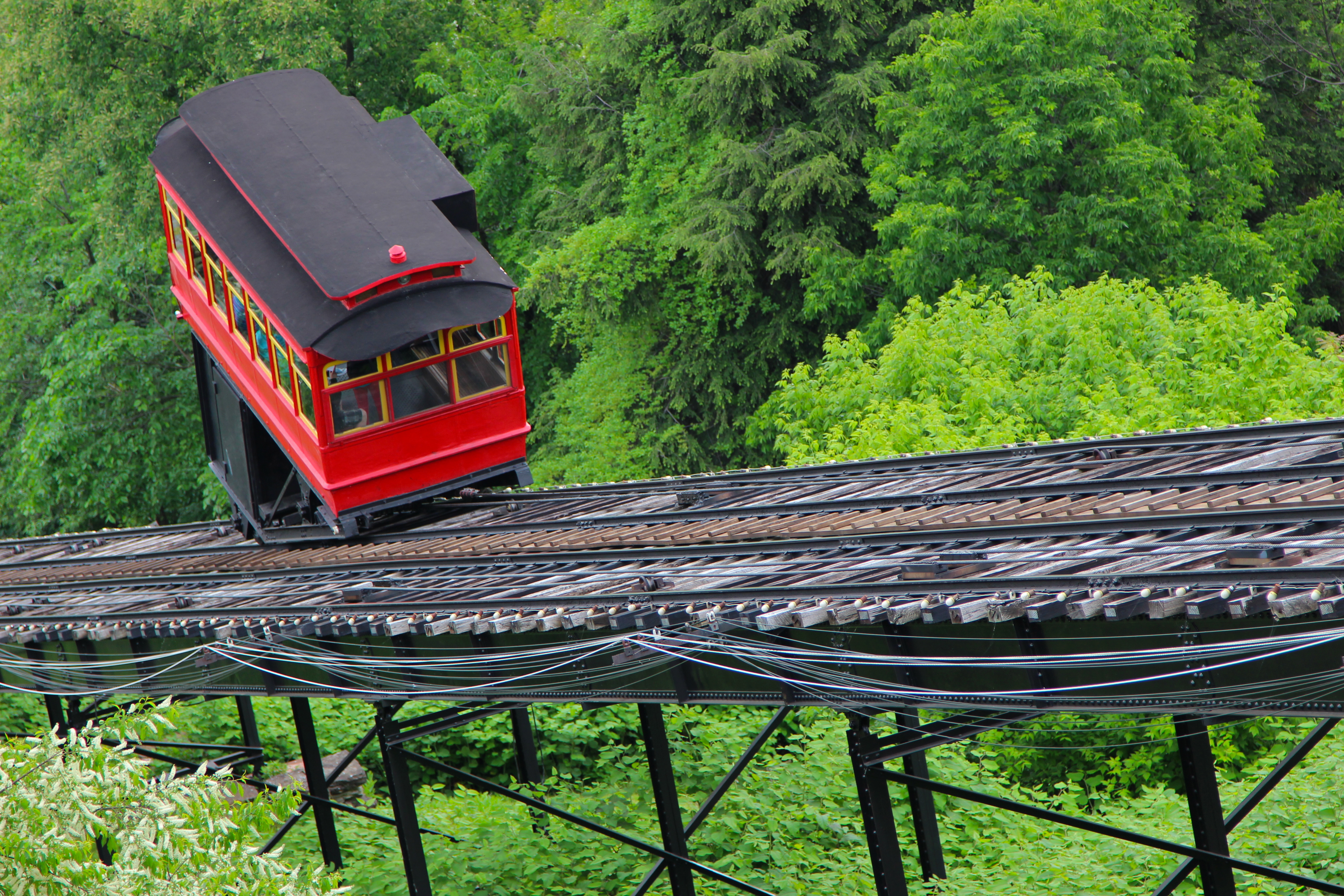
The incline from above

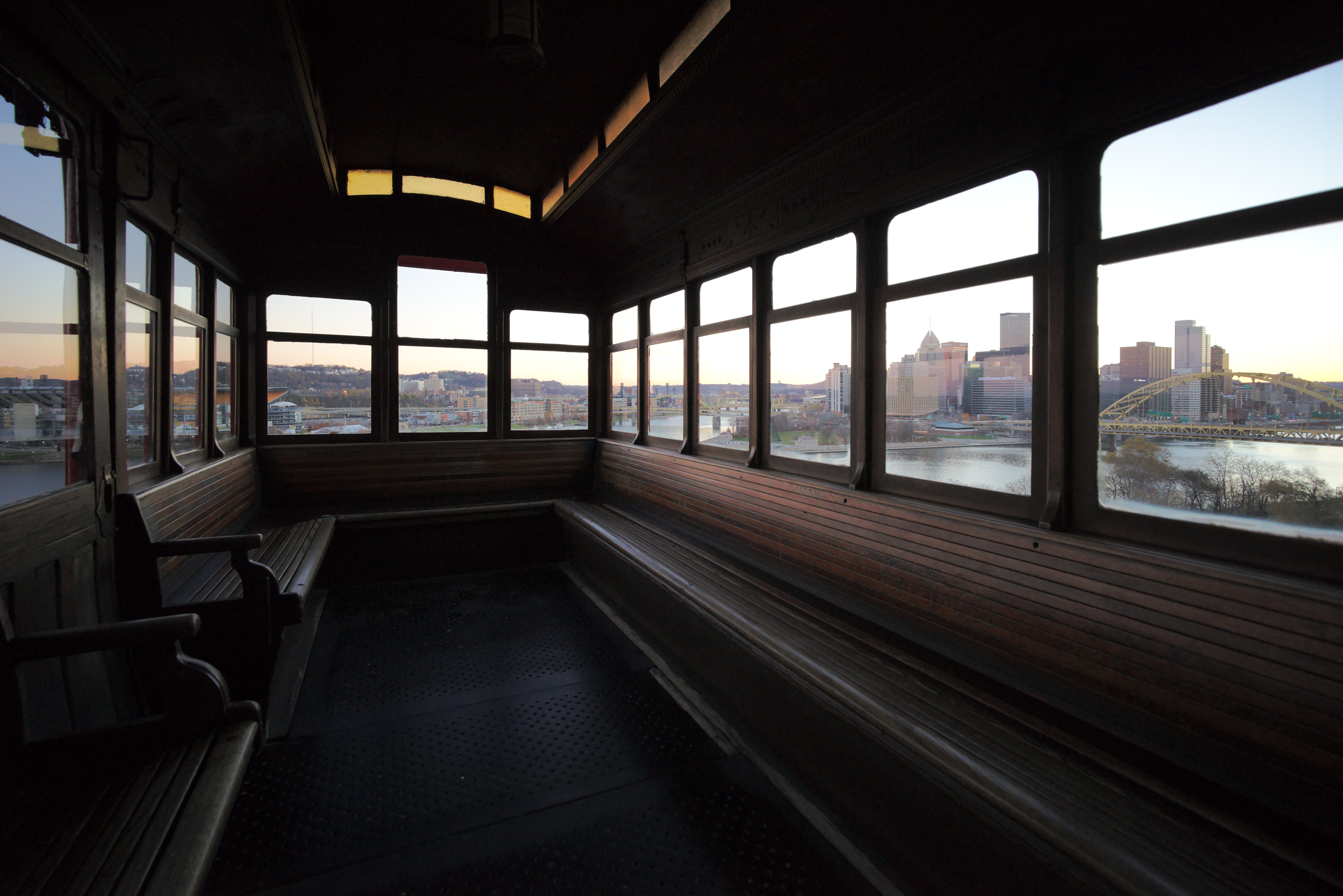
Interior view looking toward the Pittsburgh skyline

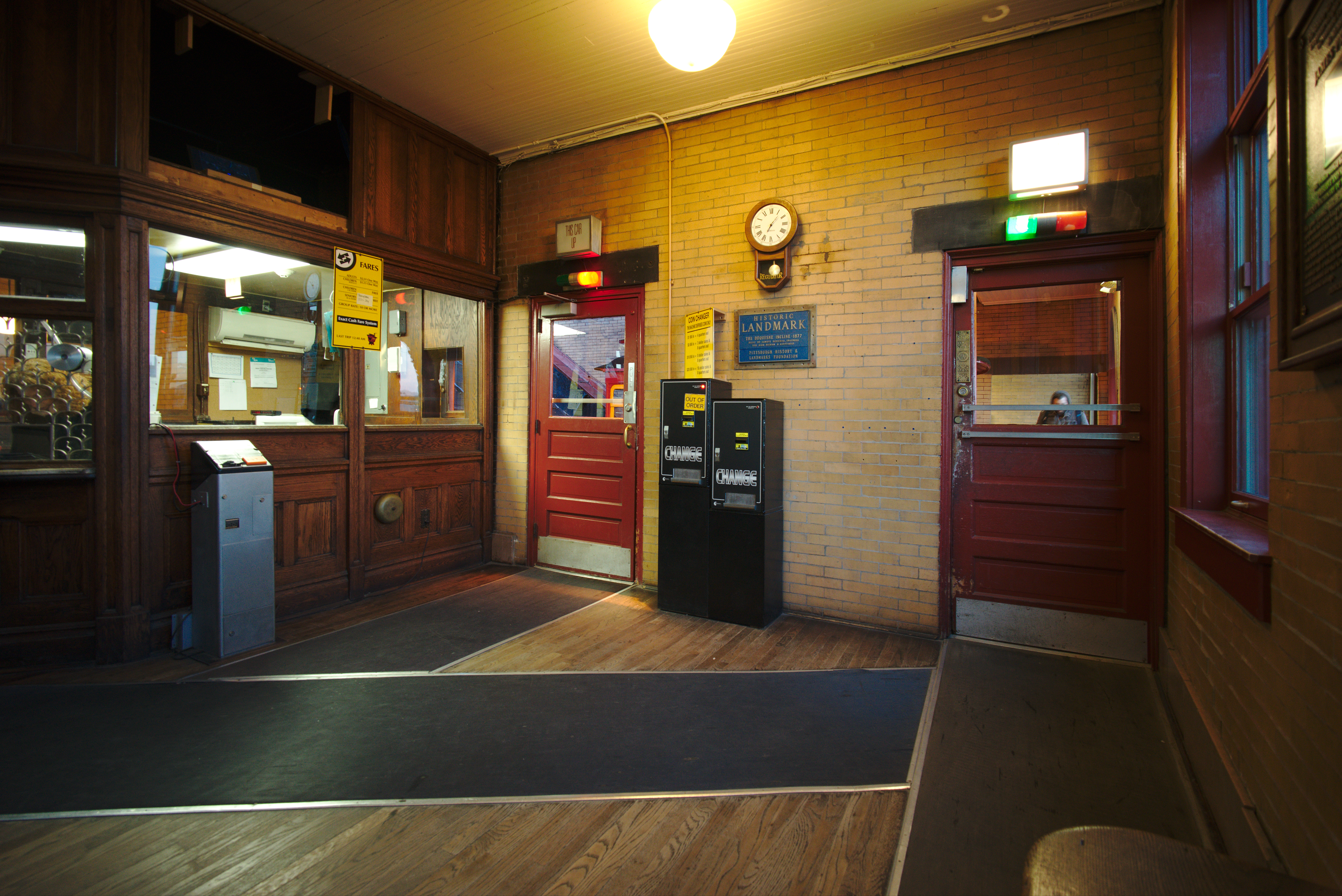
Lobby of the lower station

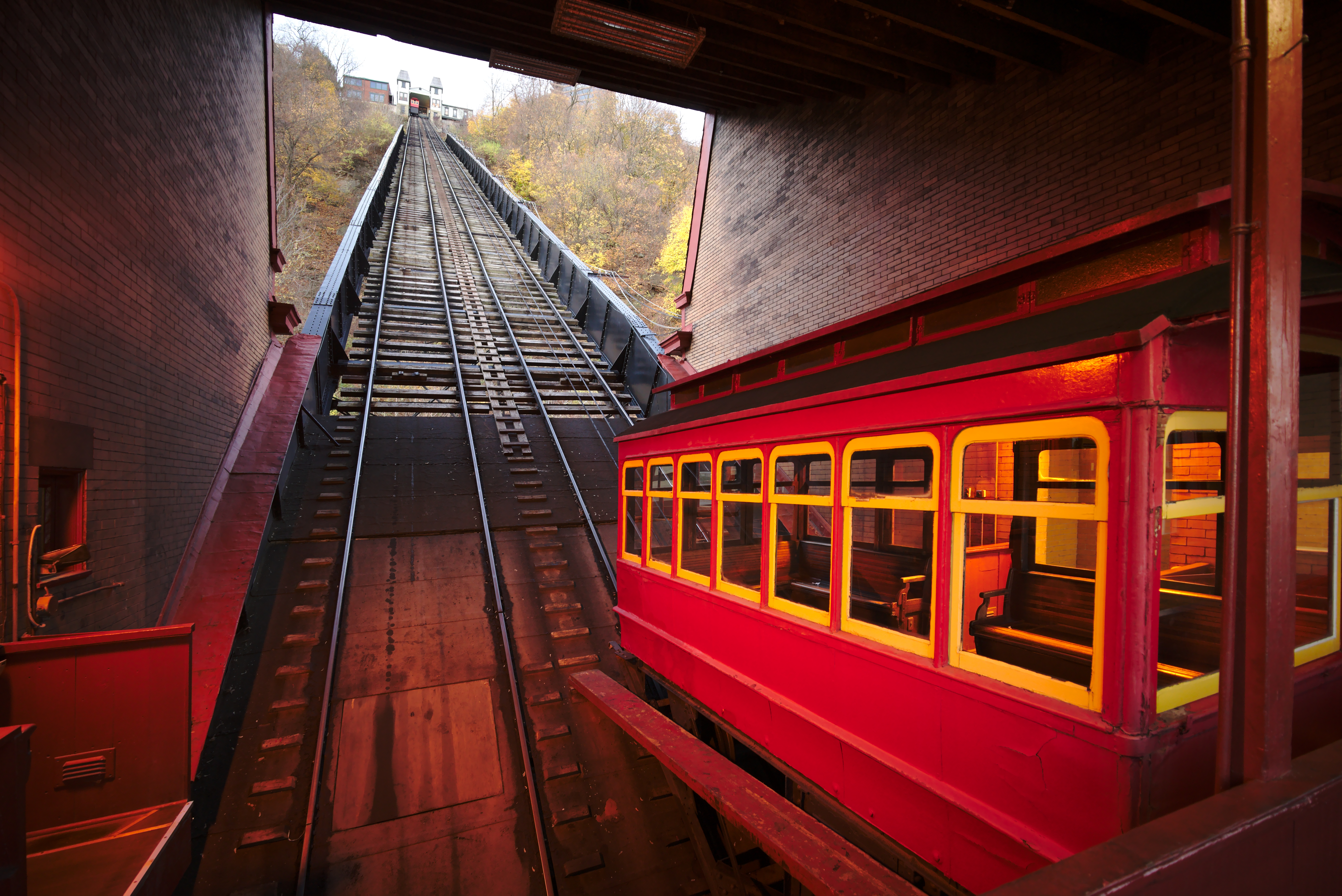
Platform of the lower station

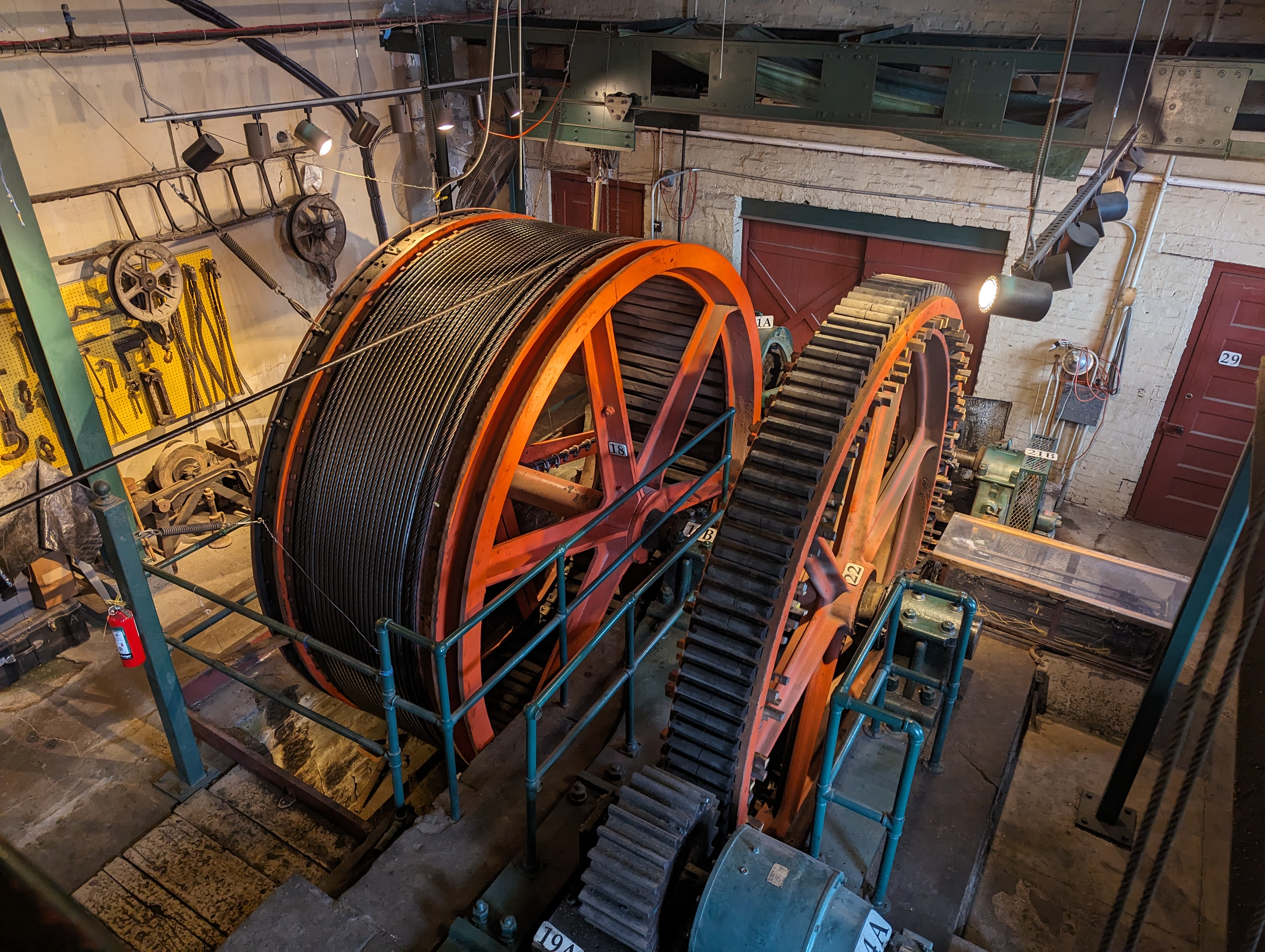
Drive gear and cable drum of the funicular

== See also ==
- Angels Flight
- Funicular railway
- Johnstown Inclined Plane
- List of funicular railways
- List of inclines in Pittsburgh
- Monongahela Incline
