= Troy Hill Incline =

Former funicular railway in Pennsylvania

Coordinates: 40.4642°N 79.9812°W

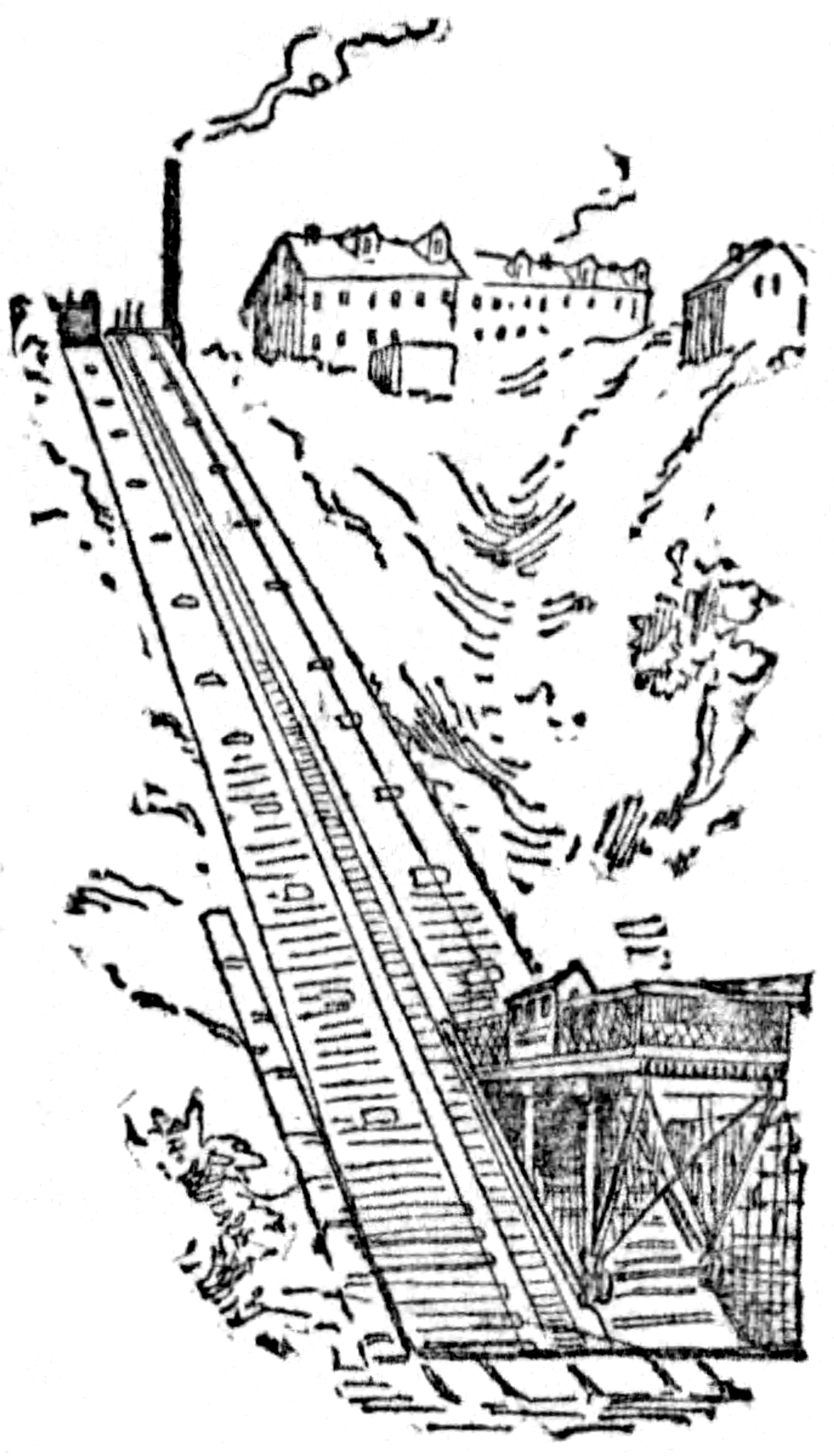
Troy Hill Incline sketch in The Pittsburg[h] Press, 1888

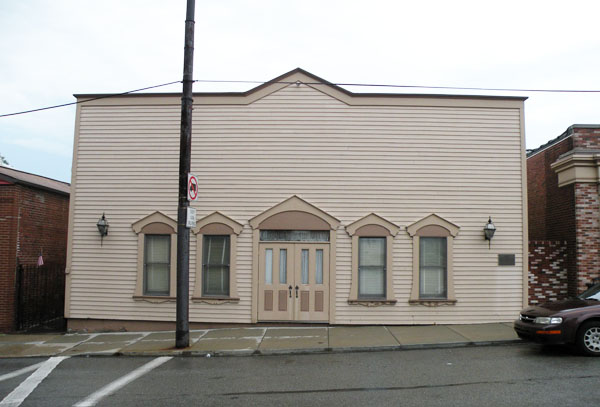
Building at the former Troy Hill Incline summit

The Troy Hill Incline, also known as the Mount Troy Incline, was a funicular railway located in old Allegheny, Pennsylvania, which is now the North Side of the city of Pittsburgh.

== History and notable features ==
Built by Gustav Lindenthal or Samuel Diescher, the incline was one of only a few funiculars constructed on the north side of Pittsburgh. It began construction in August 1887, and after considerable delay, opened on September 20, 1888. The cost of construction was about $94,047.

The incline ascended from Ohio Street near the end of the second 30th Street Bridge to Lowrie Street on the crest of Troy Hill. Its length was 370 feet (113 m), and its grade 47 percent (25 degrees). It carried both freight and passengers.

Never very profitable, it shut down in fall 1898 and was razed a decade later.

A building now standing at 1733 Lowrie Street was long thought to have been the summit station, but research in 2015 found that the building did not appear on maps until well after the incline closed.

== See also ==
- List of funicular railways
- List of inclines in Pittsburgh

== Sources ==
- A Century of Inclines, The Society for the Preservation of the Duquesne Incline.
