= Monongahela Incline =

Funicular in Pittsburgh, Pennsylvania

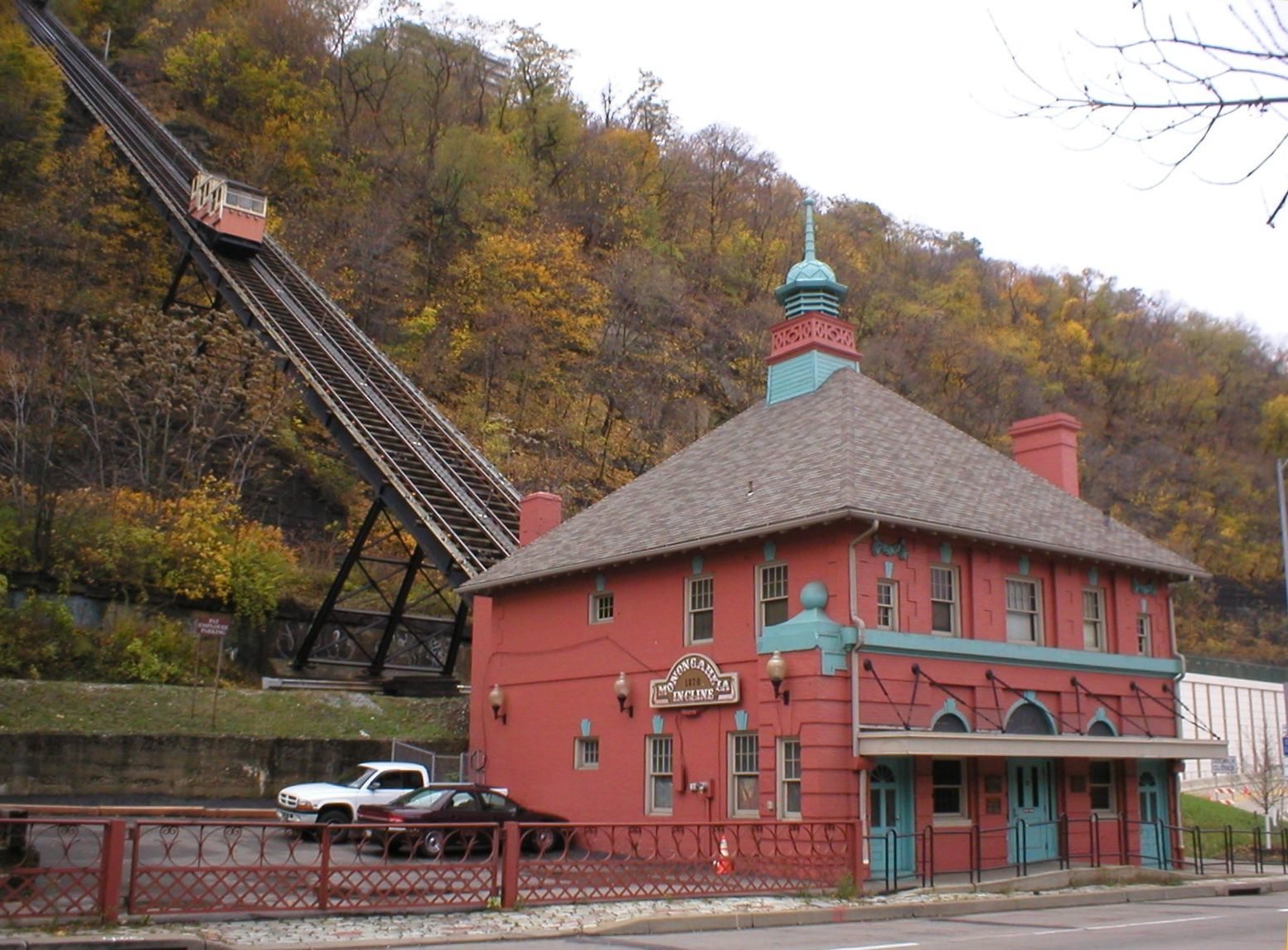
- Lower station of the Monongahela Incline

Overview
- Owner: Pittsburgh Regional Transit
- Locale: Pittsburgh, Pennsylvania, U.S.
- Termini: West Carson Street; Grandview Avenue
- Stations: 2

Service
- Type: Funicular

History
- Opened: May 28, 1870

Technical
- Line length: 635 feet (194 m)
- Track gauge: 5 ft (1,524 mm)
- Electrification: 1935
- Operating speed: 6 mph (9.7 km/h)
- Monongahela Incline
- U.S. National Register of Historic Places
- City of Pittsburgh Historic Structure
- Pittsburgh Landmark – PHLF
- Location within Pittsburgh Location within Pennsylvania Location within the United States
- Location: Grandview Avenue at Wyoming Avenue, Pittsburgh, Pennsylvania
- Coordinates: 40°25′55″N 80°0′20″W
- Area: 1 acre (0.40 ha)
- Built: 1869
- Architect: John Endres and Caroline Endres
- Architectural style: Late 19th and 20th Century Revivals, Second Renaissance Revival
- NRHP reference No.: 74001742

Significant dates
- Added to NRHP: June 25, 1974
- Designated CPHS: March 15, 1974
- Designated PHLF: 1970
Route map
Key

The Monongahela Incline is a funicular on the South Side of Pittsburgh, Pennsylvania, United States, near the Smithfield Street Bridge. Designed and built by Prussian-born engineer John Endres in 1870, it is the oldest continuously operating funicular in the United States.

Its lower station is located across the street from the Station Square shopping complex, and is accessible from the Pittsburgh Light Rail at Station Square station.

It is one of two surviving inclines in Pittsburgh, along with the nearby Duquesne Incline, from the original 17 passenger-carrying inclines in the city. In 1977, both inclines were designated as Historic Mechanical Engineering Landmarks by the American Society of Mechanical Engineers (ASME).

It was listed on the National Register of Historic Places in 1974.

== History ==
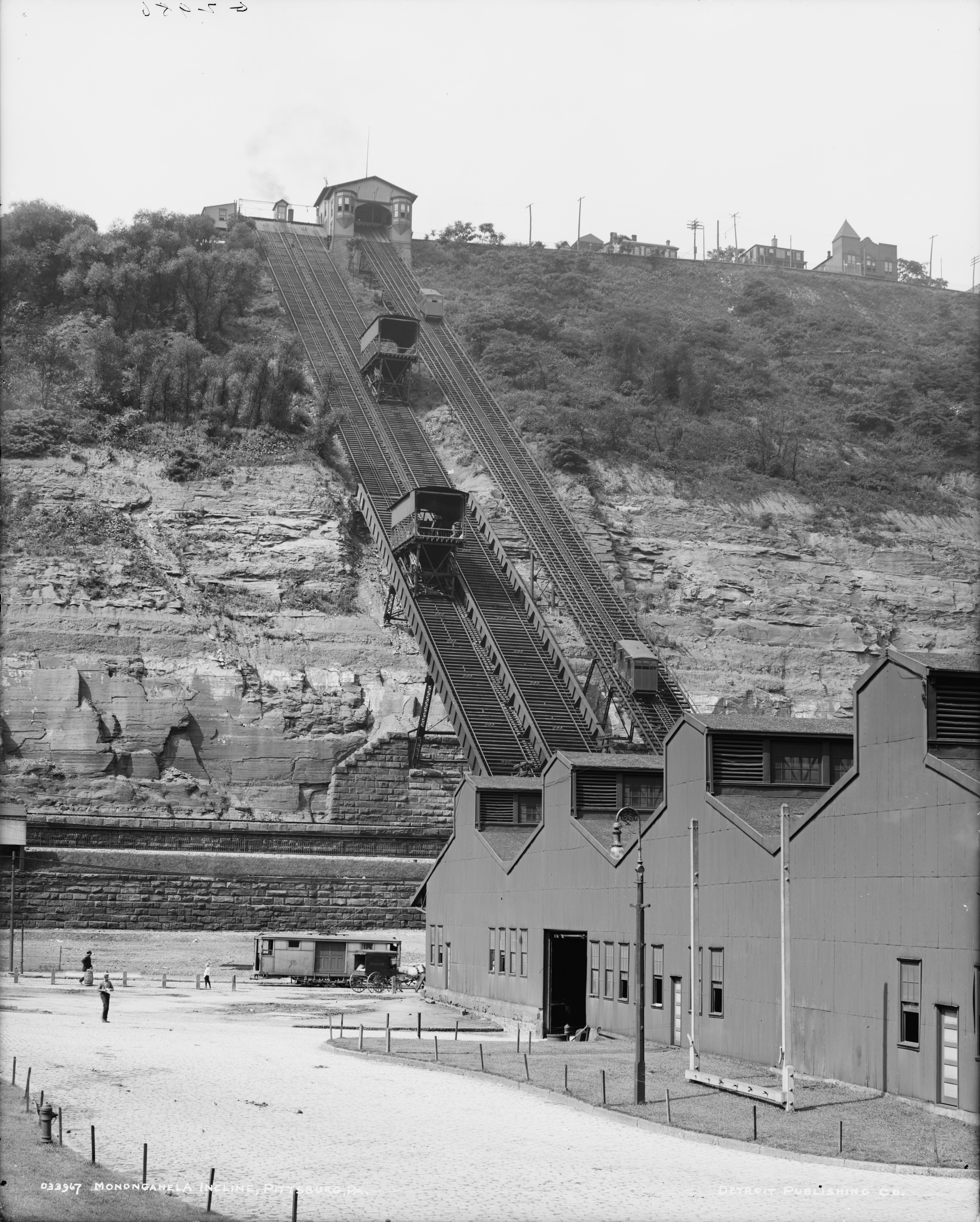
Monongahela Incline (right) and the Monongahela Freight Incline (left) in 1905. The latter has been demolished.

In the 1860s, Pittsburgh's expanding industrial base created a huge demand for labor, attracting mainly German immigrants to the region. This created a serious housing shortage, as industry occupied most of the flat lands adjacent to the south bank of the Monongahela River, leaving only the steep, surrounding hillsides of Mount Washington, or "Coal Hill", for housing. Travel between the "hill" and other areas was hindered by the steep terrain and a lack of public transport or good roads. The German immigrants who settled on Mt. Washington, remembering the Seilbahnen (cable cars) of their former country, proposed construction of inclines along the face of Coal Hill.

Prussian-born engineer John Endres of Cincinnati was commissioned to design the Monongahela Incline, which opened on May 28, 1870, as the first for passenger use. On the first day, some 944 fares were collected. On the second day, 4,174 people rode the incline and it became a success. Endres was assisted by his American-born daughter, Caroline Endres, who became one of the first women engineers in the United States.

Earlier inclines were used to transport coal in the Pittsburgh area, including the Kirk Lewis incline on Mt. Washington, and the Ormsby mine gravity plane in nearby Birmingham, which was later annexed to the city of Pittsburgh.

The Monongahela Incline was listed on the National Register of Historic Places in 1974. Both it and the Duquesne Incline were recognized in 1977 as Historic Mechanical Engineering Landmarks by the American Society of Mechanical Engineers (ASME). That year the two inclines served a total of more than one million commuters and tourists annually.

In the 21st century, the Monongahela Incline is operated by Pittsburgh Regional Transit. Transfers can be made between the incline, light rail, and buses free of charge. It serves both commuters and visitors, and is a popular tourist attraction.

On February 2, 2019, flooding caused by a broken city water main forced the incline to close. The incline reopened on May 10.

== Statistics ==
- Length: 635 feet (194 m)
- Elevation: 369.39 feet (112.59 m)
- Grade: 35 degrees, 35 minutes
- Gauge: 5 ft (1,524 mm) broad gauge
- Speed: 6 mph (9.7 km/h)
- Passenger Capacity: 23 per car
- Opened: May 28, 1870
- Renovated: 1882 (with steel structure)
- Original steam power replaced with electricity: 1935
- Renovated: 1982–83 new track structure, cars and stations
- Renovated: 1994 upper, lower stations, restored cars, replaced electric motors and controls
- Renovated: 2022–23 upper, lower stations, mechanical controls, electrical system, exterior track lighting

== Gallery ==
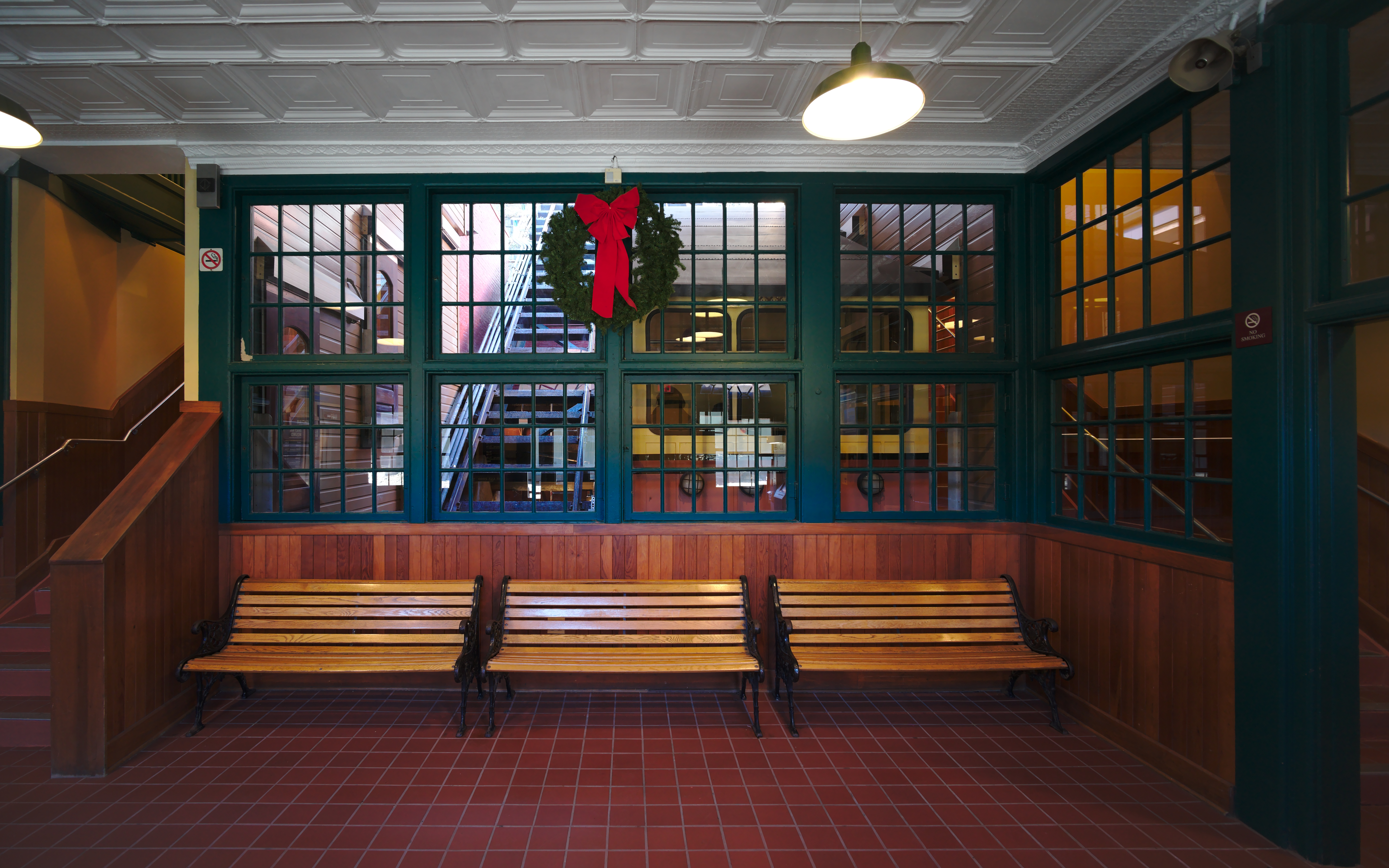
Interior of the lower station

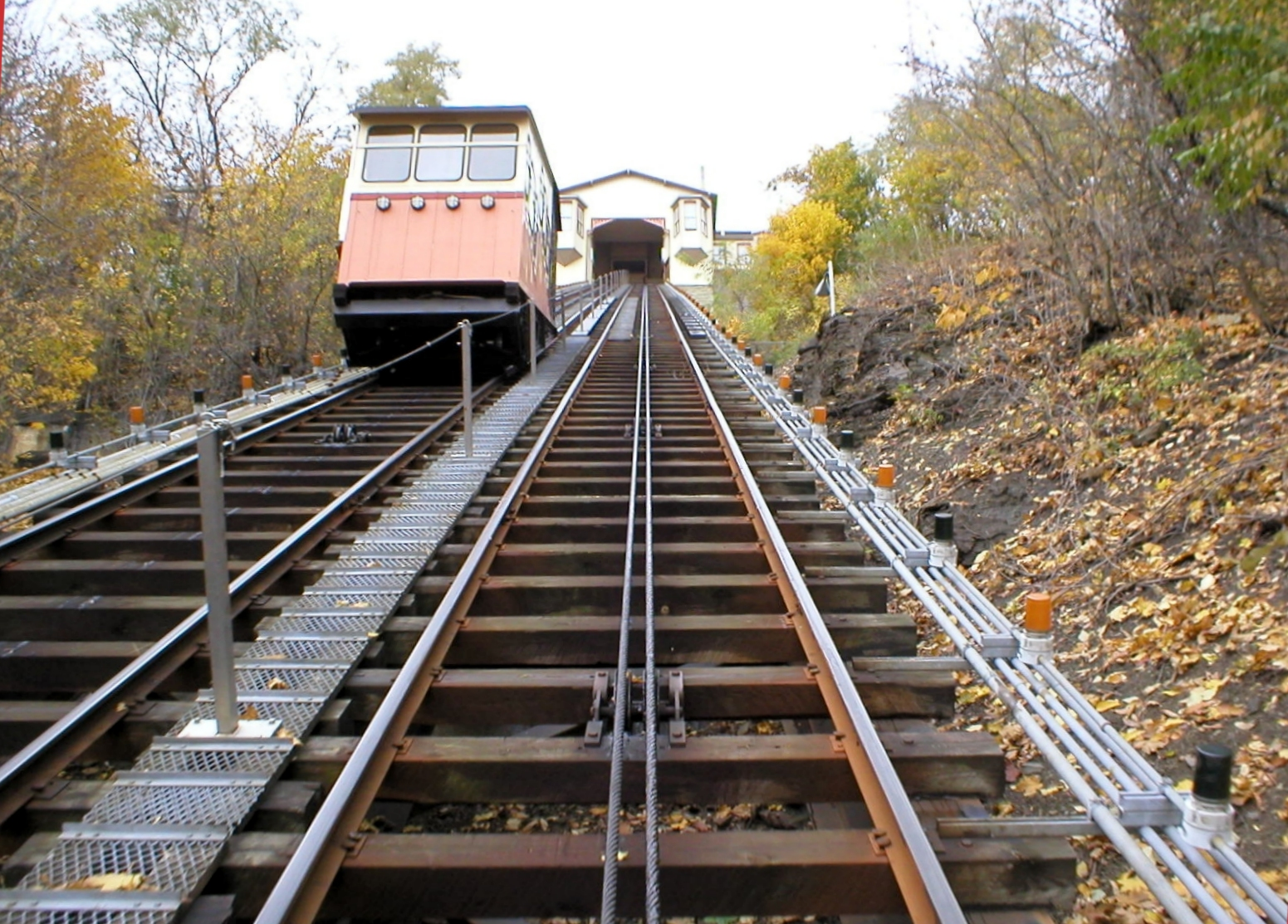
Ascending

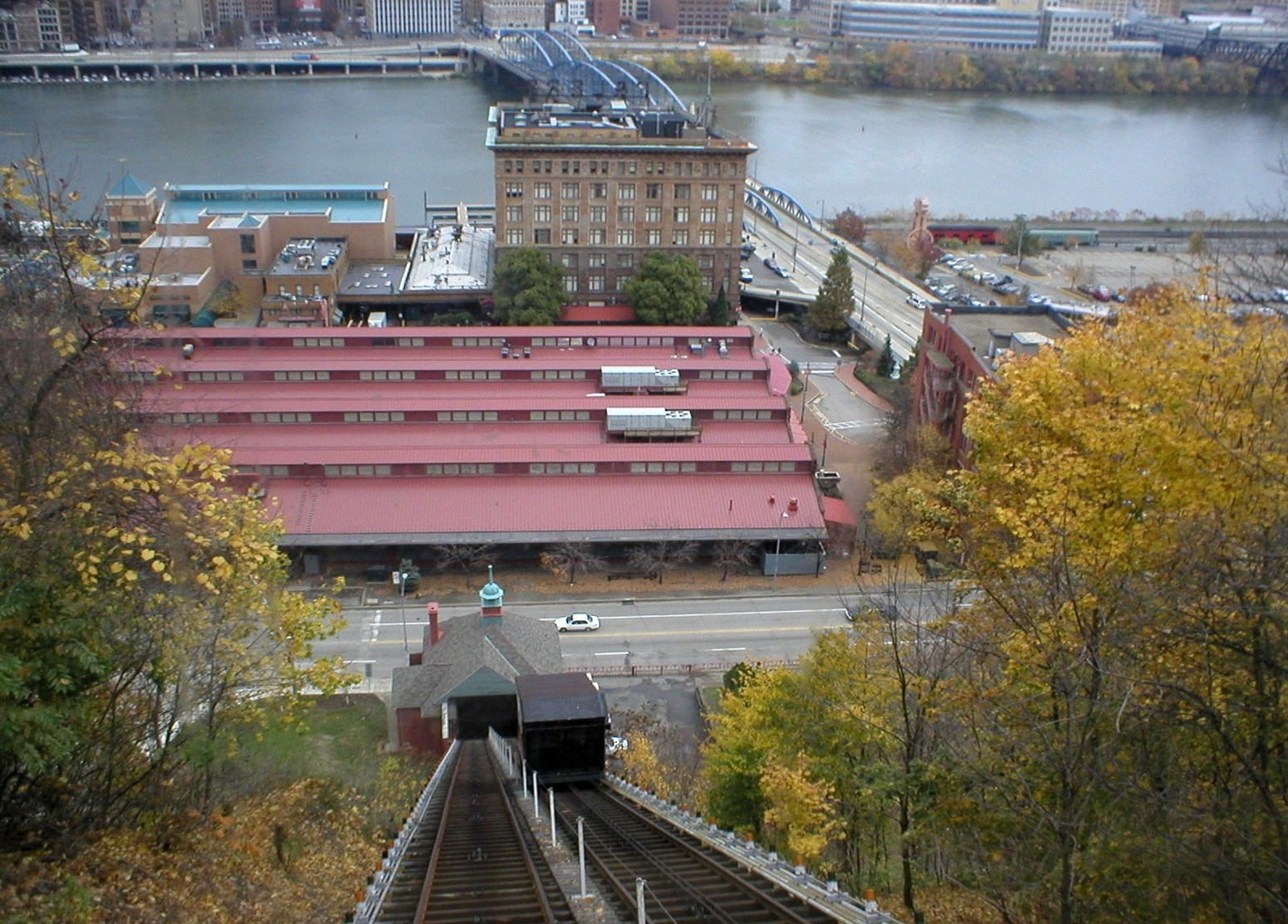
Descending view

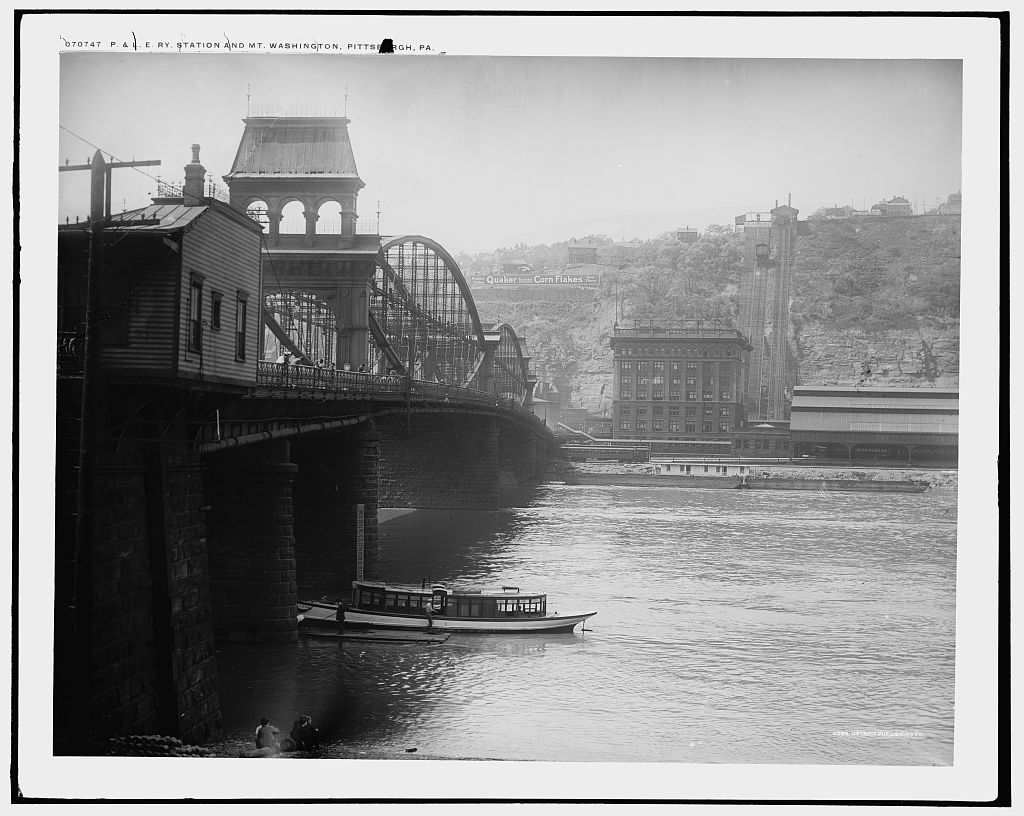
P. & L.E. Ry. Pittsburgh and Lake Erie Railroad station on far riverbank, and two inclines: Monongahela Freight Incline (L) and Monongahela Incline (R), on Mt. Washington, c.1905

== See also ==
- Angels Flight
- Duquesne Incline
- Funicular railway
- Johnstown Inclined Plane
- List of funicular railways
- List of inclines in Pittsburgh
- Monongahela Freight Incline
