= List of Historic Mechanical Engineering Landmarks =

The following is a list of Historic Mechanical Engineering Landmarks as designated by the American Society of Mechanical Engineers (ASME) since it began the program in 1971. The designation is granted to existing artifacts or systems representing significant mechanical engineering technology. Mechanical Engineering Heritage Sites are particular locales at which some event or development occurred or which some machine, building, or complex of significance occupied. Also, Mechanical Engineering Heritage Collections refers to a museum or collection that includes related objects of special significance to, but not necessarily a major evolutionary step in, the historical development of mechanical engineering.

Clicking the landmark number in the first column will take you to the ASME page on the site where you will also find the downloadable brochure from the dedication.

There are over 275 landmarks on the list.

Ref#	Year added	Name	Image	Date	Location	Region/state	Country	Notes
1	1973	Ferries & Cliffhouse Cable Railway Power House One of the most complicated cable-car systems to run from a single station.		1887	San Francisco	California	United States	Part of the modern San Francisco cable car system; ASME brochure
2	1973	Leavitt-Riedler Pumping Engine Unusual triple-expansion, three-crank "rocker" engine, driving high-capacity, high-speed pumps.		1894	Boston	Massachusetts	United States	ASME brochure
3	1974	A.B. Wood Screw Pump The most advanced low-lift drainage pump in use in the early 20th century, later used worldwide.		1914	New Orleans	Louisiana	United States	ASME brochure
4	1975	Portsmouth-Kittery Naval Shipbuilding Activity First US naval shipyard, achieving notable firsts in technology and producing many well-known US naval vessels.		1774	Kittery	Maine	United States	ASME brochure
5	1975	Boyden Hydraulic Turbines Two of the oldest surviving water turbines, probably the largest and nearly the most powerful ever built in the United States for mechanical drive. Located at Harmony Mills.		1871	Cohoes	New York	United States	ASME brochure
6	1975	Curtis 5000-kW Vertical Turbine The most powerful steam turbine-generator in the world at the time of its construction.		1903	Schenectady	New York	United States	ASME brochure
7	1975	Saugus Ironworks Reconstruction of the first successful commercial ironworks in North America.		1647	Saugus	Massachusetts	United States	ASME brochure
8	1975	Pioneer Oil Refinery California Star Oil Works A replica of the first successful commercial oil refinery in the US West.		1876	Newhall	California	United States	ASME brochure
9	1975	Chesapeake & Delaware Canal Scoop Wheel & Engines 19th-century steam pumps at the (former) summit of the ship canal.		1852	Chesapeake City	Maryland	United States	ASME brochure
10	1975	USS Texas' Reciprocating Steam Engines Last reciprocating steam engines installed in a naval ship.		1914	La Porte	Texas	United States	ASME brochure
11	1975	Paige Compositor First US typography machine to set, justify, and distribute foundry type from a common case using one operator.		1877	Hartford	Connecticut	United States	No ASME brochure available.
12	1976	Reynolds-Corliss Pumping Engine Early 20th-century water pump driven by a Corliss steam engine.		1917	Jacksonville	Florida	United States	ASME brochure
13	1976	Childs-Irving Hydroelectric Project Early 20th-century hydroelectric plant incorporating innovative technologies.	Interior of Childs power plant (MS-2-1.4-1.018)	1909	Phoenix	Arizona	United States	ASME brochure
14	1976	Hanford B Reactor First US plutonium production reactor placed in commercial operation.		1944	Richland	Washington	United States	ASME brochure
15	1976	Magma Copper Mine Air Conditioning System First air-conditioned mine in North America.		1937	Superior	Arizona	United States	ASME brochure
16	1976	Manitou and Pike's Peak Railway Highest railway in the US and highest rack railway in the world.		1891	Pikes Peak	Colorado	United States	ASME brochure
17	1976	Edgar Station, Edison Electric Illuminating Co. Power-generation station with one of the world's only high-pressure topping turbines, which set new records in the late 1920s.		1925	Weymouth	Massachusetts	United States	ASME brochure
18	1976	Mount Washington Cog Railway World's first mountain cog railway.		1869	Mount Washington	New Hampshire	United States	ASME brochure
19	1976	Folsom Power House #1 One of the first successful uses of hydroelectric power in the world, including the first successful long-distance transmission of power.		1895	Folsom	California	United States	ASME brochure
20	1977	Crawler Transporters of Launch Complex 39 Two of the largest ground vehicles ever built, including automatic load-leveling systems.		1965	Cape Canaveral	Florida	United States	ASME brochure
21	1977	Fairmount Water Works First large-scale application of steam pumping, later water power, to public water supply.		1815	Philadelphia	Pennsylvania	United States	ASME brochure
22	1977	USS Olympia, Vertical Reciprocating Steam Engines Two of the first vertical triple-expansion marine engines.		1892	Philadelphia	Pennsylvania	United States	ASME brochure
23	1977	Pit-Cast Jib Crane Last US pit-cast jib crane to operate in the casting of iron pipe.		1905	Birmingham	Alabama	United States	ASME brochure
24	1977	State Line Generating Unit 1 World's largest electric-power generator for nearly 25 years, achieving many design firsts.		1929	Hammond	Indiana	United States	ASME brochure
25	1977	Pratt Institute Power Plant The oldest steam-generating plant of its kind in the Northeastern United States.		1887	Brooklyn	New York	United States	ASME brochure
26	1977	Monongahela Incline First US passenger incline.		1870	Pittsburgh	Pennsylvania	United States	ASME brochure
27	1977	Duquesne Incline Second US passenger incline.		1877	Pittsburgh	Pennsylvania	United States	ASME brochure
28	1977	Great Falls Raceway and Power System First major US water power system and basis for integrating urban planning with industrial development.		1792	Paterson	New Jersey	United States	ASME brochure
29	1977	Vulcan Street Power Plant First Edison hydroelectric central station. Coperating landmark by ASME IEEE and ASCE.		1882	Appleton	Wisconsin	United States	ASME brochure
30	1977	Wilkinson Mill Early 19th-century textile mill and machine shop.		1810	Pawtucket	Rhode Island	United States	ASME brochure
31	1978	Interborough Rapid Transit System (Original Line) The first fully electrically signaled railroad in the United States and the first practical subway in New York City.		1904	New York	New York	United States	No ASME brochure available.
32	1978	Baltimore & Ohio Railroad Old Main Line First US railroad in public service.		1828	Maryland	Maryland	United States	ASME brochure
33	1978	Ringwood Manor Iron Complex Surviving 18th-century iron manufacturing center.		1740	Ringwood	New Jersey	United States	ASME brochure
34	1978	Joshua Hendy Iron Works Early 20th-century ironworks demonstrating the adaptability required for industrial survival.		1906	Sunnyvale	California	United States	ASME brochure
35	1979	Hacienda Azucarera la Esperanza Sugar Mill Steam Engine Typical beam steam engine of the mid-19th century, directly connected to sugar crushing rolls.		1861	Manatí	Puerto Rico	United States	ASME brochure
36	1979	RL-10 Rocket Engine First rocket engine to use high-energy liquid hydrogen as fuel.		1958	West Palm Beach	Florida	United States	ASME brochure
37	1979	A. O. Smith Automatic Frame Plant Prototype of the automated factory; dubbed the 'Mechanical Marvel.'		1920	Milwaukee	Wisconsin	United States	No longer exists. ASME brochure
38	1979	Morris Canal (Reaction) Turbine Early reaction, or Scotch, turbine, a type that later found widespread application.		1850	Port Warren	New Jersey	United States	Scotch Turbine displayed at Hopatcong State Park. ASME brochure
39	1979	Experimental Breeder Reactor I World's first nuclear power plant to demonstrate the breeder concept.		1951	Arco	Idaho	United States	ASME brochure
40	1979	Drake Oil Well First practical oil recovery system using salt-well drilling techniques and modern pipe-driving methods, marks beginning of US petroleum industry.		1859	Titusville	Pennsylvania	United States	ASME brochure
41	1980	Springfield Armory First US armory noted for machinery for mass production of small arms, including the Blanchard lathe.		1794	Springfield	Massachusetts	United States	ASME brochure
42	1980	East Wells (Onieda) Street Power Plant Pilot plant for US development of pulverized-coal firing in power-plant boilers.		1918	Milwaukee	Wisconsin	United States	ASME brochure
43	1980	Watkins Woolen Mill The best preserved 19th-century woolen mill in North America.		1868	Lawson	Missouri	United States	ASME brochure
44	1980	Fusion-welded Test Boiler Drum First fusion-welded boiler drum, tests on which led to widespread acceptance in industry.		1930	Windsor	Connecticut	United States	ASME brochure
45	1980	Georgetown Steam Plant Steam plant with early Curtis turbines, marking the beginning of the end of the reciprocating steam engine as the central station prime mover.		1906	Seattle	Washington	United States	ASME brochure
46	1980	Commonwealth Building Heat Pump First large commercial building in the United States to pioneer the use of heat pumps for heating and cooling.		1948	Portland	Oregon	United States	ASME brochure
47	1980	Shippingport Nuclear Power Station First US commercial central electric-generating station to use nuclear energy.		1958	Shippingport	Pennsylvania	United States	ASME brochure
48	1980	Edison 'Jumbo' Engine-driver Dynamo One of six dynamos from Edison's Pearl Street Station, the prototype for US central-station power generation.		1882	Dearborn	Michigan	United States	ASME brochure
49	1980	Marine-type Triple-expansion, Engine-driven Dynamo Sole surviving engine-generator set marking the beginning of large-scale electric power generation in the United States.		1891	Dearborn	Michigan	United States	No ASME brochure available.
50	1980	Cooperative Fuel Research Engine Pioneer variable-compression laboratory engine for testing fuels.		1928	Waukesha	Wisconsin	United States	ASME brochure
51	1980	Port Washington Power Plant The world's most thermally efficient steam plant for many years.		1935	Port Washington	Wisconsin	United States	ASME brochure
52	1980	Saturn V Rocket (Lyndon B. Johnson Space Center) Three sites (Texas, Florida and Alabama) were simultaneously designated (via satellite) in July 1980.		1967	Houston	Texas	United States	ASME brochure
53	1980	Saturn V Rocket (Kennedy Space Center Visitor Complex) Three sites (Texas, Florida and Alabama) were simultaneously designated (via satellite) in July 1980.		1967	Cape Canaveral	Florida	United States	ASME brochure
54	1980	Saturn V Dynamic Test Vehicle (U.S. Space & Rocket Center) Three sites (Texas, Florida and Alabama) were simultaneously designated (via satellite) in July 1980.		1966	Huntsville	Alabama	United States	ASME brochure
55	1980	Blood Heat Exchanger The first commercial human-blood heat exchanger for controlling hyperthermic temperatures during open-heart surgery.		1957	Amherst	New York	United States	ASME brochure
56	1980	Rocky River Pumped-storage Hydroelectric Plant Early example of the pumped-storage principle, at a power plant.		1929	New Milford	Connecticut	United States	ASME brochure
57	1980	Kaplan Turbine at York Haven Dam One of the first three Kaplan-type hydraulic turbines in the United States.		1929	York County	Pennsylvania	United States	ASME brochure
58	1980	Pioneer Zephyr First US diesel-powered, stainless-steel streamlined train.		1934	Chicago	Illinois	United States	ASME brochure
59	1981	Chestnut Street Pumping Engine Typical US municipal steam water-pumping engine of the late 19th century and early 20th century.		1913	Erie	Pennsylvania	United States	No ASME brochure available
60	1981	Holt Caterpillar Tractor Earliest track-type gasoline-powered tractor, influencing designs worldwide.		1918	Stockton	California	United States	No ASME brochure available
61	1981	Michigan-Lake Superior Power Hydroelectric Plant An early, extremely large-scale, low-head hydropower plant using many small turbines.		1902	Sault Ste. Marie	Michigan	United States	ASME brochure
62	1981	Southern Pacific #4294 Cab-in-Front Steam Locomotive Example of the final phase of US steam locomotive development in size and power.		1944	Sacramento	California	United States	ASME brochure
63	1981	Jackson Ferry Shot Tower One of the few surviving shot towers for making spherical lead shot.		1807	Austinville	Virginia	United States	ASME brochure
64	1981	Graue Mill One of a few survivors of typical US mill machinery with wood as the principal material.		1852	Oak Brook	Illinois	United States	ASME brochure
65	1981	Evinrude Outboard Motor Early model of outboard motor for small boats, first commercially successful.		1909	Milwaukee	Wisconsin	United States	ASME brochure
66	1981	Mount Wilson Observatory, 100-inch Hooker Telescope Unique telescope mirror support and use of mercury flotation to reduce friction.		1918	Los Angeles County	California	United States	ASME brochure
67	1981	Hiwassee Dam Unit 2 Reversible Pump-Turbine The first integrated pump-turbine to be installed in a US power plant and also the largest and most powerful in the mid-20th century.		1956	Cherokee County	North Carolina	United States	ASME brochure
68	1981	Edison Experimental Recording Phonograph The world's first practical sound recording machine.		1877	West Orange	New Jersey	United States	No ASME brochure available
69	1981	Creusot Steam Hammer The most powerful steam hammer in the world for many years.		1876	Le Creusot	Saône-et-Loire	France	ASME brochure
70	1981	Newcomen Engine Direct descendant of Thomas Newcomen's first atmospheric steam engine.		1712	Dartmouth	South Devon	United Kingdom	Located at the Dartmouth Museum. ASME brochure
71	1981	ALCOA 50,000-ton Hydraulic Forging Press One of the world's largest fabrication tools, dominant in aircraft and aerospace development.		1954	Cleveland	Ohio	United States	ASME brochure
72	1981	Rotating-arm Model-test Facility at Stevens Institute of Technology The world's first model-test facility to conduct maneuverability and control experiments for surface ships, submersibles, and airships.		1945	Hoboken	New Jersey	United States	ASME brochure
73	1982	Turbinia The world's first turbine-driven ship.		1897	Newcastle upon Tyne	Tyne and Wear	United Kingdom	ASME brochure
74	1982	Anderson-Barngrover Rotary Pressure Sterilizer The world's first continuous-stream automation of the cooking and cooling system for canned food.		1920	Santa Clara	California	United States	ASME brochure
75	1982	Alden Research Laboratory Rotating Boom Early 20th-century test facility for current meters, aircraft propellers, ships' logs, pitot tubes, and mine-sweeping paravanes.		1908	Holden	Massachusetts	United States	ASME brochure
76	1982	AC Electrification of the New York, New Haven & Hartford Railroad Pioneering venture in mainline railroad electrification. The Cos Cob plant operated until October 1986.		1907	Cos Cob	Connecticut	United States	Demolished 2001 and artifacts given to Smithsonian Institution. No ASME brochure available
77	1982	Worthington Horizontal Cross-compound Pumping Corliss-driven pump, typical of early 20th-century US practice.		1925	Erie	Pennsylvania	United States	ASME brochure
78	1982	Electro-Motive FT Freight-service Diesel-Electric Locomotive Prototype of the first mass-produced diesel-electric locomotives used for US freight service. Located at National Museum of Transportation as GM-EMD Locomotive #103.		1939	St. Louis	Missouri	United States	ASME brochure
79	1982	Lombard Steam Log Hauler The first practical example of crawler-tread vehicles now used in agricultural, construction, and military equipment. Located at the Lumberman's Museum.		1910	Patten	Maine	United States	ASME brochure
80	1982	Aberdeen Range, Aberdeen Proving Ground The world's first large-scale, fully instrumented ballistic range for producing data on aerodynamics.		1943	Aberdeen	Maryland	United States	ASME brochure
81	1983	Corning Ribbon Machine Earliest example of the machine that automated light-bulb manufacture.		1926	Dearborn	Michigan	United States	Located at The Henry Ford museum. ASME brochure
82	1983	FMC Citrus Juice Extractor Early example of machines that automated extraction of juices from fruit.		1947	Lakeland	Florida	United States	Plaque not on display. ASME brochure
83	1983	Pennsylvania Railroad GG1 Electric Locomotive #4800 Locomotive prototype for use on electrified lines in eastern US, also exceptional for its flexible suspension system.		1943	Strasburg	Pennsylvania	United States	Located at the Railroad Museum of Pennsylvania ASME brochure
84	1983	Reed Gold Mine Ten-Stamp Mill Typical late 19th-century western-US stamp mill.		1895	Midland	North Carolina	United States	ASME brochure
85	1983	PACECO Container Crane World's first high-speed, dockside container-handling crane.		1959	Alameda	California	United States	1987: Purchased by and now located in Port of Nanjing, China. 1988: Rededicated in conjunction with Chinese Mechanical Engineering Society. ASME brochure
86	1983	Owens AR Bottle Machine World's first automated bottling machine that introduced cheap and plentiful supply of glass containers.		1912	Toledo	Ohio	United States	No longer exists. No ASME brochure available
87	1983	NS Savannah The world's first nuclear-powered cargo-passenger ship.		1962	Newport News	Virginia	United States	ASME brochure
88	1983	Xerography Early models of revolutionary dry-copying process at the Battelle Memorial Institute.		1948	Columbus	Ohio	United States	ASME brochure
89	1983	Wyman-Gordon 50,000-ton Hydraulic Forging Press One of the world's largest fabrication tools, influencing aviation and aerospace technology.		1955	Grafton	Massachusetts	United States	ASME brochure
90	1984	IBM 350 RAMAC Disk File World's first computer storage device with random access to large volumes of data.		1956	San Jose	California	United States	2019: Site demolished. Artifacts now at Computer Museum; plaque not on display. ASME brochure
91	1984	Archimedes Screw Pump One of the US's oldest surviving examples of the wind-driven Archimedes screw-pump.		1890	Newark	California	United States	ASME brochure
92	1984	Stanford Linear Accelerator Center Unique electromechanical devices and systems in the longest accelerator in the world.		1962	Menlo Park	California	United States	ASME brochure
93	1984	Holland Tunnel Ventilation System The world's first long underwater tunnel designed for motor vehicles, with innovative ventilating system.		1920	New York	New York	United States	ASME brochure
94	1984	Norfolk & Western #611, Class J Steam Locomotive The last survivor of US coal-fired passenger locomotives, considered among the most advanced of any 4-8-4.		1941	Roanoke	Virginia	United States	Located at Virginia Museum of Transportation. ASME brochure
95	1984	Sikorsky VS-300 Helicopter The first practical US helicopter, pioneering the single-main-rotor concept.		1939	Dearborn	Michigan	United States	Located at The Henry Ford museum. ASME brochure
96	1984	Quincy Mining Company No. 2 Mine Hoist The world's largest mine hoist.		1920	Hancock	Michigan	United States	ASME brochure
97	1984	SS Great Britain The world's first iron-hulled, screw-propelled ship to cross any ocean, leading to Britain's world leadership in maritime commerce.		1843	Bristol	South West England	United Kingdom	ASME brochure
98	1984	SS Jeremiah O'Brien One of only two operating survivors of the US emergency-cargo fleet known as Liberty Ships.		1943	San Francisco	California	United States	ASME brochure
99	1984	Idols Station, Fries Manufacturing & Power Company Typical 19th-century small-scale, low-head run-of-the-river hydroelectric plant.		1898	Winston-Salem	North Carolina	United States	ASME brochure
100	1984	Belle Isle Gas Turbine The first gas turbine used for electric utility power generation in the United States.		1949	Schenectady	New York	United States	ASME brochure
101	1984	St. Charles Avenue Streetcar Line The oldest surviving interurban-urban passenger rail transport system in the United States.		1835	New Orleans	Louisiana	United States	ASME brochure
102	1985	Atlas Launch Vehicle First launch vehicle for the US space program.		1957	El Cajon	California	United States	ASME brochure
103	1985	First Hot Isostatic Processing Vessels Early examples of fabrication vessels using gas pressure and temperature to produce advanced alloy and ceramic products.		1956	Columbus	Ohio	United States	Located at Battelle Memorial Institute. ASME brochure
104	1985	Basic-Oxygen Steel Making Vessel Vessel that introduced the basic oxygen process to the United States.		1955	Trenton	Michigan	United States	Presently owned by Detroit Steel Company. ASME brochure
105	1985	Detroit Edison District Heating System Early example of typical US district heating plant.		1903	Detroit	Michigan	United States	ASME brochure
106	1985	Cornwall Iron Furnace Typical 19th-century US charcoal-fueled blast furnace, fully intact.		1742	Cornwall	Pennsylvania	United States	ASME brochure
107	1985	Lowell Power Canal System and Pawtucket Gatehouse Early major US water-power system and the first Francis inward-flow water turbine placed in service and oldest in existence.		1796	Lowell	Massachusetts	United States	ASME brochure
108	1985	Jacobs Engine Brake Retarder The first practical mechanism for braking large trucks with engine compression as they descend long, steep grades at controlled speeds.		1957	Bloomfield	Connecticut	United States	ASME brochure
109	1985	Geysers Unit 1 The first commercial geothermal electricity-generating station in North America.		1960	Sonoma County	California	United States	ASME brochure
110	1985	Harris-Corliss Steam Engine Example of a late 19th-century 350-hp Corliss-type steam engine.		1895	Atlanta	Georgia	United States	Located at Randall Brothers, Inc. ASME brochure
111	1986	Boulton & Watt Rotative Steam Engine Oldest surviving operable rotative steam engine by Boulton and Watt.		1785	Sydney	New South Wales	Australia	Located at the Powerhouse Museum. ASME brochure
112	1985	TV Emery Rice Steam Engine Mid-19th-century horizontal compound marine steam engine with return connecting rod.		1873	Kings Point	New York	United States	ASME brochure
113	1986	Fairbanks Exploration Company Gold Dredge No. 8 One of the last mammoth gold dredges in the United States accessible to the public.		1927	Fairbanks	Alaska	United States	ASME brochure
114	1986	Pitney-Bowes Model M Postage Meter Early model of world's first commercial postage meter.		1920	Stamford	Connecticut	United States	ASME brochure
115	1986	Disneyland Monorail System The first commercial Wenner-Gren monorail system.		1959	Anaheim	California	United States	ASME brochure
116	1987	McKinley Climatic Laboratory Test facility with unequalled capacity to simulate a wide range of climatic conditions from arctic cold to jungle moisture for full-scale equipment testing.		1944	Eglin Air Force Base	Florida	United States	ASME brochure
117	1987	Icing Research Tunnel, NASA Lewis Research Center The world's oldest and largest refrigerated icing wind tunnel, with unique heat exchanger and spray system.		1944	Cleveland	Ohio	United States	ASME brochure
118	1987	Samson Mine Reversible Waterwheel & Man Engine Hoists representative of bygone practice, including a waterwheel for ore hoisting and a mechanism to hoist workers.		1837	Sankt Andreasberg	Lower Saxony	Germany	ASME brochure
119	1987	American Precision Museum		1966	Windsor	Vermont	United States	No ASME brochure available
120	1987	Robbins & Lawrence Machine Shop Site of first machine shop to achieve interchangeable manufacture on a practical scale.		1846	Windsor	Vermont	United States	ASME brochure
121	1987	Holly Fire Protection and Water System Site of the first US integrated system to supply water for public safety.		1863	Lockport	New York	United States	No ASME brochure available
122	1987	Holly District Heating System Site of the first US district heating steam-heating system.		1877	Lockport	New York	United States	No ASME brochure available
123	1987	Kingsbury Thrust Bearing First and still-operating Kingsbury thrust bearing in hydroelectric service, later used worldwide for all types of large machinery.		1911	Holtwood	Pennsylvania	United States	Located at Holtwood Dam. ASME brochure
124	1987	Chapin Mine Pump Late 19th-century steeple compound-condensing engine and one of the largest at the time.		1893	Iron Mountain	Michigan	United States	ASME brochure
125	1987	Pullman Sleeping Car Glengyle Earliest known survivor of the fleet of heavyweight, all-steel sleepers built by the Pullman Company.		1911	Dallas	Texas	United States	Located at Museum of the American Railroad. ASME brochure
126	1987	Westmoreland Iron Works An early and long-running malleable ironworks.		1850	Westmoreland	New York	United States	Early 1990s: Foundry closed and plaque given to the Westmoreland Historical Society. No ASME brochure available
127	1987	Big Brutus Mine Shovel One of the world's largest power shovels.		1962	West Mineral	Kansas	United States	ASME brochure
128	1987	Vallecitos Boiling Water Reactor The world's first privately owned and operated nuclear power plant to deliver significant quantities of electricity to a public utility grid.		1957	Alameda County	California	United States	ASME brochure
129	1987	Holyoke Water Power System Major 19th-century US industrial center for paper and textile industries, known for its machine shops and water-power system.		1859	Holyoke	Massachusetts	United States	See also: Holyoke Dam, Holyoke Heritage State Park. No ASME brochure available
130	1987	Stirling Water-tube Boilers Oldest existing steam generator in a US cotton mill.		1906	Dalton	Georgia	United States	No ASME brochure available
131	1988	Roosa Master Diesel Fuel-Injection Pump Early developmental models of distributor-type injection pump for controlling engine speed.		1947	Windsor	Connecticut	United States	ASME brochure
132	1988	Chicago Burlington & Quincy Railroad Roundhouse Innovative railroad yard machine shop for first railroad linking Chicago and the Mississippi River.		1858	Aurora	Illinois	United States	ASME brochure
133	1988	Buckeye Steam Traction Ditcher Earliest surviving example of the first successful traction ditching machine for laying agricultural drainage tiles.		1902	Findlay	Ohio	United States	Located at Hancock Historical Museum. ASME brochure
134	1988	Geared Locomotives of Heisler, Shay, Climax Early examples of small slow-speed 19th-century geared locomotives.		1872	Felton	California	United States	No ASME brochure available
135	1988	Neuchâtel Gas Turbine The world's first successful electricity-generating gas turbine to go into commercial operation.		1939	Neuchâtel	Neuchâtel	Switzerland	ASME brochure
136	1988	AAR Railroad-wheel Dynamometer The first and only railroad dynamometer to test track wheels using vertical and lateral loads as well as thermal braking at the wheel rim.		1955	Pueblo	Colorado	United States	ASME brochure
137	1989	Texas & Pacific #610 Lima Superpower Steam Locomotive The sole surviving example of the earliest form of "superpower" steam locomotives.		1927	Rusk	Texas	United States	No ASME brochure available
138	1989	ASME Boiler and Pressure Vessel Code The first comprehensive standard for the design, construction, inspection, and testing of boilers and pressure vessels, greatly influencing public safety.		1915	Dearborn	Michigan	United States	Early book on loan to The Henry Ford museum. No ASME brochure available
139	1989	Roebling 80-ton Wire Rope Machine The only remaining Roebling machine, largest wire-rope closing machine in 1893.		1893	Trenton	New Jersey	United States	ASME brochure
140	1989	Propulsion Wind Tunnel Facility Wind Tunnel The world's first large-scale testing facility for jet and rocket engines in simulated high-speed flight conditions.		1955	Arnold Air Force Base	Tennessee	United States	No ASME brochure available
141	1989	Browning Firearms Collection Collection of sporting and military firearms designed by John Moses Browning.		1878	Ogden	Utah	United States	Located at Ogden Union Station Museum. ASME brochure
142	1990	Pierce-Donachy Ventricular Assist Device The world's first implantable heart pump to receive widespread clinical use.		1973	Hershey	Pennsylvania	United States	ASME brochure
143	1990	USS Cairo Engine and Boilers The sole survivor of the fleet of river gunboats built by the Union during the US Civil War.		1862	Vicksburg	Mississippi	United States	ASME brochure
144	1990	Curtis 500-kW Vertical Turbine The first steam turbine electric-generation station.		1903	Indianapolis	Indiana	United States	ASME brochure
145	1990	Southern Gas Association-PCRC Analog Facility The first computer system to be applied to the design of natural-gas pipeline systems.		1955	San Antonio	Texas	United States	ASME brochure
146	1990	National Soil Dynamics Laboratory The world's first full-size laboratory for tillage tools and traction equipment in all types of soils.		1935	Auburn	Alabama	United States	ASME brochure
147	1990	Baltimore & Ohio #4500, Freight, USRA 2-8-2A The first USRA freight locomotive built, representing the first standardized family of US locomotives.		1918	Baltimore	Maryland	United States	ASME brochure
148	1990	Atlantic Coast Line #1504, USRA 4-6-2A An early example of USRA passenger locomotives representing the first US standardization program.		1919	Jacksonville	Florida	United States	Located at the Prime Osborn Convention Center. ASME brochure
149	1990	Hydromatic Propeller Early example of propeller innovations, including variable-pitch control and feathering capability.		1938	Windsor Locks	Connecticut	United States	Located at the New England Air Museum. ASME brochure
150	1990	Pin-Ticketing Machine Early model of first successful price-marking, tag-attachment machine for US retail merchandising.		1902	Miamisburg	Ohio	United States	ASME brochure
151	1991	Victoria Dutch Windmill Mid-19th-century wind-powered gristmill of Dutch turret-mill style.		1870	Victoria	Texas	United States	ASME brochure
152	1991	Jeep Model MB Early four-wheel drive, multipurpose field vehicle representing an unusual combination of modern vehicle design.		1947	Toledo	Ohio	United States	ASME brochure
153	1991	Cruquius Pumping Station 19th-century steam pumping station that drained the Haarlemmermeer.		1849	Haarlemmermeer	North Holland	Netherlands	ASME brochure
154	1991	Greens Bayou Generator Plant The first fully outdoor turbine-generator to be placed in commercial operation.		1949	Houston	Texas	United States	ASME brochure
155	1991	Milam High-rise Air Conditioned Building The first US air-conditioned high-rise office building.		1928	San Antonio	Texas	United States	ASME brochure
156	1991	Lookout Mountain Incline Railway 19th-century 3-rail incline.		1895	Chattanooga	Tennessee	United States	ASME brochure
157	1991	Pelton Waterwheel Collection Collection on the origins of the Pelton turbine and its principle of the "splitter" bucket.		ca. 1880	Grass Valley	California	United States	ASME brochure
158	1991	Fresno Scraper 19th-century example of the scraper whose design served as the basis for most giant earth-movers.		1883	Fresno	California	United States	ASME brochure
159	1991	Nassawango Iron Furnace The earliest surviving hot-blast furnace in the United States.		1828	Snow Hill	Maryland	United States	ASME brochure
160	1992	ABACUS II Integrated-Circuit Wire Bonder The world's first practical production machine for the assembly of integrated circuits, making possible their economical production.			Dallas	Texas	United States	ASME brochure
161	1992	Q-R-S Marking Piano One of the first machines to produce master rolls for player pianos by recording actual performances.		1912	Buffalo	New York	United States	ASME brochure
162	1992	Apollo Space Command Module Apollo command module incorporating many innovations to allow safe transport of humans to moon and back.		1968	Titusville	Florida	United States	ASME brochure
163	1992	Meter-type Gas Odorizer Early safety device for introducing odor into natural-gas lines to make leaks apparent.		1937	Dallas	Texas	United States	ASME brochure
164	1992	New England Wireless and Steam Museum Collection of Rhode Island steam engines, including one of the few surviving built at the Corliss Works.		1964	East Greenwich	Rhode Island	United States	ASME brochure
165	1992	Old Mill in Nantucket The oldest operating smock-type windmill in the United States.		1746	Nantucket	Massachusetts	United States	ASME brochure
166	1992	Milwaukee River Flushing Station A water pump which reduced the concentration of pollutants in an urban stream had the world's greatest capacity.		1888	Milwaukee	Wisconsin	United States	Now part of coffee shop. ASME brochure
167	1993	Ginaca Pineapple Processing Machine Example of automated peeling and slicing machine that led to commercial pineapple production.		1911	Honolulu	Hawaii	United States	ASME brochure
168	1993	Pegasus 3 Engine BS 916 Earliest surviving example of the prototype engine for vertical/short takeoff and landing (V/STOL) jets, namely Harriers and AV-8Bs		1960	Bristol	South West England	United Kingdom	ASME brochure
169	1993	Cryogenic Cooling System, Fermilab Tevatron The largest cryogenic system ever built, providing benchmark for superconducting magnet designs.		1983	Batavia	Illinois	United States	ASME brochure
170	1993	Advanced Engine Test Facility at Marshall Unique cooling system for the testing of aerospace engines.		1964	Redstone Arsenal	Alabama	United States	ASME brochure
171	1993	Voyager Spacecraft Interplanetary Explorers The two most intelligent machines ever built by NASA space program.		1972–1977	Pasadena	California	United States	Located at Jet Propulsion Laboratory. ASME brochure
172	1994	Bay City Walking Dredge The last remaining dredge in the United States with unique propulsion system, designed for a wetlands environment.		1924	Naples	Florida	United States	ASME brochure
173	1994	Burton Farmers Gin Mill The earliest known survivor of an integrated cotton ginning system widely used in the southern United States.		1914	Burton	Texas	United States	ASME brochure
174	1994	Crown Cork and Soda Filling Machine One of two surviving automated machines that founded the bottling industry.		1892	Baltimore	Maryland	United States	ASME brochure
175	1994	Bergen County Steam Collection A collection of operational steam engines and auxiliary equipment from the 19th century to the 1940s.		1987	Hackensack	New Jersey	United States	ASME brochure
176	1994	Union Pacific Big Boy 4023 and Centennial 6900 Two heavy-tonnage locomotives incorporating the best features of the day.		1941	Omaha	Nebraska	United States	ASME brochure
177	1994	Barker Turbine/Hacienda Buena Vista The only known example of a Barker hydraulic turbine, the earliest practical reaction type.		1853	Ponce	Puerto Rico	United States	ASME brochure
178	1994	Boeing 367-80 Prototype of the Boeing 707 and most jet transport systems, establishing economic feasibility of commercial air travel.		1954	Fairfax County	Virginia	United States	Located at Steven F. Udvar-Hazy Center. ASME brochure
179	1994	Newell Shredder The second and earliest surviving automobile shredder for recycling scrap metal.		1969	San Antonio	Texas	United States	ASME brochure
180	1994	Johnstown Incline One of the world's steepest vehicular inclines, typical of several built in the 19th century in Western Pennsylvania.		1891	Johnstown	Pennsylvania	United States	ASME brochure
181	1994	B.F. Clyde's Cider Mill The oldest steam powdered cider mill in the US. A rare survivor of a once-commonplace rural US industry.		1898	Mystic	Connecticut	United States	ASME brochure
182	1995	Knight Foundry and Machine Shop One of the earliest US water-powered foundry-machine shops, including Knight impulse turbines.		1873	Sutter Creek	California	United States	ASME brochure
183	1995	Wright Field 5-foot Wind Tunnel Early example of the "modern" wind tunnel for aircraft-model testing.		1921	Wright-Patterson Air Force Base	Ohio	United States	ASME brochure
184	1995	Gravimetric Coal Feeder The earliest known coal feeder, representing innovations that influenced nearly all industries using coal-fired boilers.		1957	Cleveland	Ohio	United States	ASME brochure
185	1995	Ljungström Air Preheater Experimental model of the industrial air preheater, now used worldwide.		1920	Stockholm	Stockholm County	Sweden	ASME brochure
186	1995	Steamboat William G. Mather Prototypical ore boat on the Great Lakes.		1925	Cleveland	Ohio	United States	ASME brochure
187	1996	NASA Ames Unitary Plan Wind Tunnel R&D facility for testing of supersonic aircraft and spacecraft.		1956	Mountain View	California	United States	ASME brochure
188	1996	Garfield Thomas Water Tunnel Unique experimental facility for hydrodynamic research and testing.		1949	State College	Pennsylvania	United States	Located at Pennsylvania State University. ASME brochure
189	1996	Montgomery Glider First heavier-than-air human-carrying aircraft to achieve controlled piloted flight.		1883	San Carlos	California	United States	Located at Hiller Aviation Museum. ASME brochure
190	1996	Hart Parr Tractor Earliest known internal-combustion-engined agricultural tractor in the United States.		1903	Charles City	Iowa	United States	ASME brochure
191	1996	SS Badger Carferry One of the last operating American steam lake boats with reciprocating engines and coal-fired boilers.		1952	Ludington	Michigan	United States	ASME brochure
192	1996	Thermo King© C Refrigeration Unit Earliest known refrigeration unit for trucks, having worldwide impact on food preservation.		1940	Minneapolis	Minnesota	United States	ASME brochure
193	1997	Alligator Amphibian Prototype of all tracked ship-to-shore landing vehicles.		1940	Quantico	Virginia	United States	Located at the Marine Corps Air-Ground Museum. ASME brochure
194	1997	Kew Bridge Cornish Beam Engines Five notable 19th-century Cornish beam engines for municipal water supply.		1975	Brentford	Greater London	United Kingdom	ASME brochure
195	1997	Bay Area Rapid Transit The most advanced automated urban rail transit system incorporating many innovations, marking a new generation of rail travel.		1972	San Francisco Bay Area	California	United States	ASME brochure
196	1997	Bessemer Conversion Engine An early example of the successful conversion of steam engines to internal-combustion engines.		ca. 1900	Rockford	Michigan	United States	ASME brochure
197	1998	David Taylor Model Basin Among the world's largest test facilities for the development of ship design.		1939	Bethesda	Maryland	United States	ASME brochure
198	1998	GE's Ultra High Pressure Apparatus for the Production of Diamonds First apparatus to consistently produce industrial diamonds, demonstrating fundamentals of producing and containing very high pressures and becoming the basis for the industrial-diamond production that followed.		1954	Schenectady	New York	United States	Located at the Schenectady Museum. No ASME brochure available
199	1998	Hulett Ore Unloaders The largest and oldest surviving example of a highly efficient materials-handling machine unique to the Great Lakes that revolutionized ore handling and led to its rapid adoption throughout the lower-lake ore ports.		1912	Cleveland	Ohio	United States	2000: 2 of the 4 loaders have been demolished and scrapped, while the other 2 were disassembled. ASME brochure
200	1998	Paddle Steamer Uri The oldest operating vessel with a diagonal, compound steam engine, with disc valve gear.		1901	Lucerne	Lucerne	Switzerland	ASME brochure
201	1998	Cooper Steam Traction Engine Collection Engines from the collection are among the oldest surviving agricultural steam engines, from 1860 to 1883, showing the conversion to mechanized farming.		1860–1883	Mount Vernon	Ohio	United States	Located at the Knox County Historical Society. ASME brochure
202	1998	William Tod Rolling-Mill Engine Representative of steam-powered rolling-mill-engine drives early in the transition to electric drive and typical of the largest work pieces produced by U.S. foundries and forges.		1914	Youngstown	Ohio	United States	No ASME brochure available
203	1998	Siegfried Marcus Car Direct predecessor of the modern automobile.		ca. 1875	Vienna		Austria	Located at the Technical Museum, Vienna. No ASME brochure available
204	1999	Kinne Water Turbine Collection The largest collection of American turbine development.		1907–1937	Watertown	New York	United States	Located at the Jefferson County Historical Society. ASME brochure
205	1999	Peterborough Hydraulic (Canal) Lift Lock The world's highest operating hydraulic lift lock, operating on the balance principle.		1904	Peterborough	Ontario	Canada	No ASME brochure available
206	1999	Merrill Wheel Balancing System Innovative method of wheel balancing (on the vehicle) adopted worldwide.		1945	Englewood	Colorado	United States	No ASME brochure available
207	2000	Refrigeration Research Museum A private collection that represents many of the advances in mechanical refrigeration for US residential and commercial use from the late 19th century up to 1960.		1890–1960	Brighton	Michigan	United States	ASME brochure
208	2000	Fairbanks-Morse Y-VA Engine Diesel The earliest (perhaps only) existing example of early high-compression, cold-start, full-diesel engines developed in the United States for isolated or rural power generation machinery before widespread electrification was available.		1924	Lee County	Florida	United States	ASME brochure
209	2000	USS Albacore An experimental submarine that pioneered the teardrop-shaped hull, high-strength steel, and many other test concepts affecting speed, depth changes, and underwater maneuvering.		1953	Portsmouth	New Hampshire	United States	ASME brochure
210	2000	Link C-3 Flight Trainer An early flight simulator representative of the first truly effective mechanical device used to simulate actual flight processes.		ca. 1935	Binghamton	New York	United States	ASME brochure
211	2000	Tokaido Shinkansen The world's first high-speed railway, which operated at about 210 km/h (130 mph).		1964	Tokyo to Shin-Ōsaka		Japan	No ASME brochure available
212	2000	EIMCO Rocker Shovel Loader, Model 12B The first successful mining device to replace human labor in removing the rubble from underground hard-rock blasting.		1938	Park City	Utah	United States	Plaque located at Miners Plaza in historic Old Park City. ASME brochure
213	2000	George W. Woodruff School of Mechanical Engineering Leader in transforming mechanical engineering education from a shop-based, vocational program to a professional one built on rigorous academic and analytical methods.		1888	Atlanta	Georgia	United States	ASME brochure
214	2001	Colvin Run Mill A good example of a typical early 19th-century (US) water-powered, Evans-type flour mill, restored into operating condition.		ca. 1810	Great Falls	Virginia	United States	ASME brochure
215	2001	Coolspring Power Museum An impressive variety of internal combustion engines, built primarily between 1890 and 1920 and consisting mainly of stationary engines used in industrial applications.		1890–1929	Coolspring	Pennsylvania	United States	ASME brochure
216	2001	Arecibo Observatory The largest single-aperture radio telescope ever constructed.		1963	Arecibo	Puerto Rico	United States	Joint designation with IEEE. ASME brochure
217	2001	Radio City Music Hall Hydraulically Actuated Stage One of the largest movable stages in the world with innovative hydraulic equipment and controls, a forerunner of other stage designs as well as early aircraft carrier elevator systems.		1932	New York	New York	United States	No ASME brochure available
218	2002	Apollo Lunar Module LM-13 First piloted vehicle designed to operate solely in the vacuum of space.		1972	Garden City	New York	United States	Located at the Cradle of Aviation Museum. ASME brochure
219	2002	Howard Hughes Flying Boat, HK-1 The largest wood-constructed and the largest wingspan airplane ever built.		1947	McMinnville	Oregon	United States	Located at the Evergreen Aviation & Space Museum. ASME brochure
220	2002	Pilatusbahn The world's steepest cog railway.		1882	Mount Pilatus		Switzerland	ASME brochure
221	2002	Brandywine River Powder Mills The largest U.S. maker of explosive black powder, a once-important and now-obsolete 19th-century technology.		1803–1921	Wilmington	Delaware	United States	ASME brochure
222	2002	Ditch Witch® DWP Service-Line Trencher The first mechanized, compact service-line trencher.		1952	Perry	Oklahoma	United States	ASME brochure
223	2003	Solar Energy and Energy Conversion Laboratory Pioneering developments in solar-energy applications, with global accomplishments in training and innovation.		1954	Gainesville	Florida	United States	ASME brochure
224	2003	Wright Flyer III The first practical airplane.		1905	Dayton	Ohio	United States	Located at the Dayton Aviation Heritage National Historical Park. ASME brochure
225	2003	Rumely Companies' Agricultural Products Produced a line of agricultural equipment that played a vital role in the evolution of farming.		1853	La Porte	Indiana	United States	ASME brochure
226	2003	Eddystone Station Unit #1 The second U.S. (earliest extant) supercritical steam-electric generating unit, pioneering significant increases in steam pressure, steam temperature, and unit size.		1960	Eddystone	Pennsylvania	United States	ASME brochure
227	2003	First Ram-Type Blowout Preventer (BOP) First ram-type blowout preventer, which sealed the wellhead and controlled pressure during drilling and oil production operations.		1922	Houston	Texas	United States	ASME brochure
228	2003	Philo 6 Steam-Electric Generating Unit The world's first commercial supercritical steam-electric generating unit.		1957	Columbus	Ohio	United States	ASME brochure
229	2003	Great Northern 2313 — Montana Western 31 Gas The oldest-surviving Electro-motive Company (EMC) gas-electric rail motorcar and the oldest with Lemp control.		1925	North Freedom	Wisconsin	United States	Located at the Mid-Continent Railway Museum. ASME brochure
230	2004	Lapeyre Automatic Shrimp Peeling Machine For decades, the elegantly simple Model A has proven to be the most effective and widely used method of automatic shrimp peeling, despite attempts by others to develop alternative approaches.		1949	Biloxi	Mississippi	United States	ASME brochure
231	2004	R.G. Letourneau Mountain Mover This innovative scraper moved four times as much earth as conventional machines of the era which required a tractor and two operators.		1922	Longview	Texas	United States	ASME brochure
232	2004	Reuleaux Collection Of Kinematic Mechanisms The world's largest collection of 19th-century kinematic mechanisms.		1882	Ithaca	New York	United States	Located at Cornell University. ASME brochure
233	2005	Model T 15 millionth Model T to come off the assembly line, marking the end of its production.		1908–1927	Dearborn	Michigan	United States	Located at The Henry Ford museum. ASME brochure
234	2005	The United States Standard Screw Threads The first US system of standardized screw threads.		1864	Philadelphia	Pennsylvania	United States	ASME brochure
235	2005	Ottmar Mergenthaler's Square Base Linotype Machine One of two surviving square-base linotypes.		1886	Carson	California	United States	Located at the International Printing Museum. No ASME brochure available
236	2005	Birome Ballpoint Pen Collection First ballpoint pens; utilized the concept of a quick-drying ink whose flow is controlled by gravity and a metal ball housed in a socket.		1938–1948	Buenos Aires		Argentina	ASME brochure
237	2005	Eiffel Drop Test Machine and Wind Tunnel Most accurate to date drop-test device and wind tunnel to measure drag on falling objects of various shapes.		1903 & 1912	Paris		France	ASME brochure
238	2006	Grumman Wildcat "Sto-Wing" Wing-folding Mechanism First functional wing-folding mechanism, enabling aircraft to take up less space on ships.			Kalamazoo	Michigan	United States	Located at Air Zoo aviation museum. ASME brochure
239	2006	Hughes Glomar Explorer A deep-sea drillship platform initially built for the United States Central Intelligence Agency Special Activities Division secret operation Project Azorian to recover the sunken Soviet submarine, K-129, lost in April 1968.		1972	Houston	Texas	United States	ASME brochure
240	2006	Cooper-Bessemer Type GMV Integral-Angle Gas E Providing efficient compression energy for natural gas, petrochemical, refinery, and power industries around the world.		1944	Mount Vernon	Ohio	United States	Located at the Knox County Historical Museum. ASME brochure
241	2006	Noria al-Muhammadiyya A set of seventeen large water wheels operating on the River Orontes as they have for many centuries.		1361	Hama	Hama Governorate	Syria	ASME brochure
242	2006	Split-Hopkinson Pressure Bar Apparatus (1962) The first apparatus able to directly generate a complete dynamic (high-rate) stress-strain curve in a single experiment.		1962	San Antonio	Texas	United States	ASME brochure
243	2008	Digital Micromirror Device Modulating digital light pulses using up to 2 million micromirrors.		1996	Plano	Texas	United States	ASME brochure
244	2008	Johnson Controls Multi-Zone Automatic Temperature Control System The first automated temperature control system for multi-zone applications.		1895	Milwaukee	Wisconsin	United States	Located at Johnson Controls HQ bldg. ASME brochure
245	2008	John Penn & Sons Oscillating Steam Engine The first steam engine to utilize oscillatory cylinders. Installed in the steamboat Diesbar.		1841	Dresden	Saxony	Germany	ASME brochure
246	2009	Hughes Two-Cone Drill Bit Key technology that allowed drilling through medium and hard rock, tapped vast oil reservoirs much deeper below the surface than previously possible, and significantly improved the efficiency and cost of drilling.		1908	The Woodlands	Texas	United States	ASME brochure
247	2010	Belle of Louisville The oldest operating "western rivers" steamboat.		1914	Louisville	Kentucky	United States	ASME brochure
248	2011	Southern Railway Spencer Shops One of the few remaining intact 20th-century railroad locomotive facilities in the United States.		1896	Spencer	North Carolina	United States	Now the North Carolina Transportation Museum. ASME brochure
249	2011	Sholes & Glidden 'Type Writer' Represents the first commercially successful typewriter to be manufactured in quantity for sale to the public.		1873	Milwaukee	Wisconsin	United States	Located at the Milwaukee Public Museum. ASME brochure
250	2012	Mr. Charlie Oil Drilling Rig The first offshore drilling rig that was fully transportable, submersible and self-sufficient.		1953	Morgan City	Louisiana	United States	ASME brochure
251	2012	Textile Machinery Collection at the American Textile History Museum Represents some of the most significant collection of 19th century tools and machinery for the manufacturing of textiles.		1960	Lowell	Massachusetts	United States	Museum closed in 2016. ASME brochure
252	2013	Big Surf Waterpark The first wave pool in North America to consistently generate 3–5 foot spilling waves suitable for surfing.		1969	Tempe	Arizona	United States	ASME brochure
253	2013	Titan Crane The largest crane of the hammer-head or "Titan" type.		1907	Clydebank	West Dunbartonshire	United Kingdom	No ASME brochure available
254	2013	Collection of the Earliest Self-Governing Windmills The Collection contains many early windmills.		1870	Batavia	Illinois	United States	Batavia, IL was the location of 6 'American Farm Windmill' makers from about 1870 until WWII. ASME brochure
255	2013	Apollo Space Suit Model A7L was the primary suit worn by astronauts on Project Apollo.		1968	Frederica	Delaware	United States	ASME brochure
256	2014	Thrust Supersonic Car (ThrustSSC) The first car to officially exceed the speed of sound, the ThrustSSC Supersonic Vehicle.		1997	Coventry		United Kingdom	ASME brochure
257	2015	Northern Pacific Rotary Snow Plow No. 2 The first machine to reliably remove deeply packed snow from railroad tracks.		1887	Duluth	Minnesota	United States	ASME brochure
258	2015	Technology Collection at the George Eastman House The world's preeminent museum of photography with many important artifacts.		1949	Rochester	New York	United States	ASME brochure
259	2015	Funicular Giessbach, designed by Carl Roman Abt The first funicular to employ a single, two-rail track, with a short side track for the two cars to pass at midpoint. The passing track used turnouts with no moving parts known as Abt Switches.		1879	Giessbach	Brienz	Switzerland	ASME brochure
260	2016	Pratt & Whitney R-1340 Wasp engine The Wasp R-1340 was a significant improvement to the radial aircraft engine design, making commercial aviation viable as early as the 1920s.	Pratt and Whitney Wasp	1925	Windsor Locks	Connecticut	United States	ASME brochure
261	2016	3D Printing: Stereolithography First commercially available 3D Printer, developed by Charles Hull.	Stereolithography apparatus	1984	Rock Hill	South Carolina	United States	ASME brochure
262	2016	Worthington Direct Acting Steam Pumps The pumps built by the firm of Worthington & Baker with worldwide industrial applications.		1838	Newport News	Virginia	United States	Henry Worthington was a founder of ASME. ASME brochure
263	2016	Rainhill Locomotive Trials An important competition in the early days of steam locomotive railways. Five engines competed along a mile length of level track.		1829	Rainhill	Lancashire	United Kingdom	ASME brochure
264	2017	Museo Storico dei Motori e dei Meccanismi Museum of Engines and Mechanisms: Stationary and transportation power units, with an emphasis on automotive and aircraft engines.	Museum of Engines and Mechanisms - University of Palermo (Italy)	February 25, 2011	Palermo	Sicily	Italy	Located at the University of Palermo. ASME brochure
265	2018	Single Crystal Turbine Blade Single crystal turbine blades have no crystalline boundaries, resulting in greater resistance to fracture and corrosion as well as vastly improved creep performance than conventional multi-crystalline nickel-cobalt alloy blades. Developed by Pratt & Whitney.		1960s	Windsor Locks	Connecticut	United States	ASME brochure
266	2018	Carpet Tufting Apparatus Invented by Ernest Moench, the machinery featured a durable needle that punched loops of thick fabric through a web of backing material, resulting in the reliable, high-speed tufting of carpet. Descendants of the apparatus fabricate more than three-quarters of the carpets produced in the US.		1928	Dalton	Georgia	United States	ASME brochure
267	2018	Janney Railcar Coupler Recognized for its impact on rail safety and its technological significance. The interlocking coupler, which resembled a curled human hand, was the successor to the "link and pin" coupler, a device that required rail workers to stand between train cars while joining them-—a dangerous procedure that resulted in numerous injuries and deaths.		1873			United States	ASME brochure
268	2018	Princeton Plasma Physics Laboratory The laboratory has been at the forefront of the quest to develop magnetically controlled fusion energy since its founding by Lyman Spitzer, who invented the stellarator, or "star generator".	NSTX		Princeton	New Jersey	United States	ASME brochure
269	2019	Johannes Gutenberg's system of movable type system Gutenberg's movable type system reduced the time and cost of producing the printed word, resulting in the widespread availability of books and the advancement of literacy. His system incorporated a fast-drying ink; a durable easy-to-cast metal alloy for making type; a screw press designed for rapid operation; and an adjustable mold for the quick casting of metal type.		1440	Strasbourg		France	virtual landmark ASME brochure (coming soon)
270	2019	The Thurston Collection of Laboratory Artifacts at Cornell University The devices used at Cornell between 1885 and 1905, exemplify Robert Henry Thurston's vision of the central role of the engineering laboratory in training mechanical engineers		1885-1905	Ithaca	New York	United States	ASME brochure
271	2019	Antikythera Mechanism The earliest known analog computer, an inscribed astronomical and calendrical device, designed to predict astronomical phenomena such as lunar and solar eclipses, as well as other functions.		2nd C. BCE		Athens	Greece	ASME brochure (coming soon)
272	2019	West Point Foundry Major American ironworking and machine shop site, operating from 1818 to early 20thC. It became most famous for its production of Parrott rifle artillery and other munitions, although it also manufactured a variety of iron products for civilian use.		1818	Cold Spring	New York	United States	West Point Foundry Preserve A/V tour (Scenic Hudson). ASME brochure
273	2019	Westinghouse Automatic Air Brake In 1869, George Westinghouse patented an automatic air brake system for railroads. It had a built-in safeguard to apply the brakes on the entire train should it separate. It made possible longer and faster trains and improved the safety of rail transportation.		1872	Pittsburgh	Pennsylvania	United States	ASME brochure
274	2020	Perkins Vapor-Compression Cycle for Refrigeration (Perkins)		1834			England	ASME brochure
275	2021	Reflections on the Motive Power of Fire (Carnot)		1824			France	virtual landmark
276	2021	Standardized Steam Property Tables		1921			United States	ASME brochure
277	2022	Finite Element Analysis		1960s			United States	virtual landmark
278	2022	Crocodile Locomotive Ce 6/8 II		1918	Erstfeld	Uri	Switzerland	

== See also ==
- American Society of Mechanical Engineers (ASME)
- Institution of Mechanical Engineers
- List of Historic Civil Engineering Landmarks
- Mechanical Engineering Heritage (Japan)
