= List of inclined elevators =

This is a list of inclined elevators, organised by place within country and region.

An inclined elevator is distinguished from the similar funicular railway in that its cars operate independently whereas funiculars are composed of two vehicles that synchronously counterbalance one another. Despite this distinction, some inclined elevators use the term funicular in their names, which is seen in both systems converted from funiculars to inclined elevators, such as the Old Quebec Funicular in Quebec City and the Montmartre Funicular in Paris, and in systems built originally as inclined elevators, such as the 100 Street Funicular in Edmonton and the Ljubljana Castle funicular. Some English language installations use the term "inclinator", a portmanteau of incline and elevator. This list includes counter-weighted, non-counter-weighted and climbing elevators operating on fixed and variable inclinations.

== Americas ==
=== Belize ===
- Belcampo Resort, Punta Gorda

=== Bolivia ===
- Lav Paz Aerial Tramway Station 17 feeder, Mi Teleférico, La Paz

=== Brazil ===
- Pico do Jaraguá, São Paulo (currently inactive)

=== Canada ===
==== Alberta ====
- 100 Street Funicular, Edmonton
- Edmonton Convention Centre, Edmonton

==== Nova Scotia ====
- Residential Lakeside Tram, Five Islands

==== Ontario ====
- Peace Tower, Ottawa (travels on a 10° angle for the first 98 feet (30 m), shifting its position horizontally 12 feet 2.25 inches (3.7148 m), and straight up for the 60 feet 9 inches (18.52 m) remainder of the climb)

==== Quebec ====
- Old Quebec Funicular, Quebec City (converted from funicular to inclined elevator in 1988)
- Olympic Stadium (Montreal), Montreal

=== Guatemala ===
- La Lancha Jungle Tram, La Lancha Hotel, Lake Petén Itzá, El Remate

=== Panama ===
- Smithsonian Tropical Research Institute Jungle Tram, Panama Canal

=== United States ===
==== Alaska ====
- Creek Street Funicular Tram, Ketchikan

==== Arizona ====
- Scorpion Bay Marina Incline Elevator, Peoria
- Merkin Vineyards Hilltop Tram, Cottonwood

==== Arkansas ====
- Ozark Folk Center, Mountain View

==== California ====
- Commercial Installation, Santa Rosa
- Residential Curved Rail & Custom Car Hill Lift, Belvedere (variable inclination)
- Residential Custom Cable Car, Tiburon
- Residential Hillside, Malibu Beach
- Residential Installation, Carmel-by-the-Sea
- San Diego Convention Center, San Diego
- Shadowbrook Restaurant Cable Car, Capitola
- Strand Beach Elevator, Dana Point

==== Connecticut ====
- Residential Installation, New Fairfield

==== Maine ====
- Residential Hillside Lift, Long Island

==== Maryland ====
- Arlington Echo Outdoor Education Center, Millersville
- Patuxent River State Park, Upper Marlboro

==== Massachusetts ====
- Pilgrim Monument Inclined Elevator, Provincetown
- White Cliffs Country Club, Cedarville, Plymouth

==== Michigan ====
- John Ball Zoological Garden, Grand Rapids

==== Minnesota ====
- Residential Lake Tram, Central Minnesota

==== Missouri ====
- Gateway Arch Tram, St. Louis (variable inclination)

==== Nevada ====
- Luxor Las Vegas hotel, Las Vegas

==== New York ====
- Residential Lake Erie Tram, Lake View
- 34th Street–Hudson Yards station on the IRT Flushing Line, New York City
- Vessel (climbing elevator that traces variable inclination), New York City

==== North Carolina ====
- Residential Mountain Lake Access, Cashiers

==== Ohio ====
- Valravn Roller Coaster evacuation and maintenance inclined elevator, Cedar Point

==== Pennsylvania ====
- Ridgewood Incline, Allegheny City (1886-1887)

==== Puerto Rico ====
- Hotel El Conquistador, a Waldorf Astoria Resort (Colloquially known as Funicular despite being two independent moving cars), Fajardo, PR

==== Tennessee ====
- Hillbilly Golf, Gatlinburg, has an inclined elevator which takes players to the top of a mountain (where they can choose from one of two miniature golf courses) and (on call) picks them up roughly midway up the mountain for the return trip.

==== Texas ====
- Cityplace/Uptown station, DART rail in Dallas
- NorthShore Marina Lake Tram Systems, Jonestown
- Rough Hollow Yacht Club and Marina Tram System, Lakeway
- Villas on Travis Lakeside Tram, Austin

==== Utah ====
- Park City, The St. Regis Funicular (pair of independent, non-counterweighted lifts operating on a variable incline).

==== Virginia ====
- George Washington Masonic National Memorial, Alexandria
- Huntington station (Washington Metro), Washington Metropolitan Area Transit Authority, in Huntington

==== Washington ====
- Grand Coulee Dam Inclined Elevator, Grand Coulee

==== Wisconsin ====
- Clifton Highlands Golf Club, Prescott
- Residential Inclined Tram, Hudson
- Villa Terrace Decorative Arts Museum, Milwaukee

== Asia ==
=== China ===
==== Mainland ====
- Badaling Great Wall railway station, Beijing
- Big Air Shougang, Beijing
- Shidu Donghugang Grand Canyon, Beijing
- Chifeng Bridge, Tianjin
- Snow Ruyi National Ski Jumping Centre, Zhangjiakou
- Yesanpo National Park, Baoding
- Oriental Pearl Tower, Shanghai
- Sound of the Phoenix Grand Theater, Qingdao
- Hongshan Bridge, Changsha
- Taizhou TV Tower, Taizhou
- Three Centers building, Changde City
- Enshi Grand Canyon, Enshi
- Window of the World, Shenzhen
- Laodong Lu station, Suzhou
- Times Square station, Suzhou
- Wangdong Changjiang Bridge, Anhui
- CHN Energy Houziyan Hydropower Station of Dadu River, Kangding
- Chinese Eastern Railway Park sightseeing tower, Harbin
- Wanda Cultural Tourism City, Harbin
- Sarira Pagoda of Famen Temple, Fufeng
- ShuimengTingyuan Villa, Lishui
- Taiping Mountain, Longshan
- Dong'ao Island, Zhuhai
- Liujiahe Water Park, Laishui
- Haitang Bay Landscape Bridge of Hexin Island, Sanya
- Ma'anshan Yangtze River Bridge, Ma'anshan
- Foguang Temple, Ningbo
- Tanhualin, Wuhan

==== Hong Kong ====
- Discovery Bay, Lantau Island
- Lift and Pedestrian Walkway System Between Tai Wo Hau Road and Wo Tong Tsui Street, Kwai Chung
- Cameron Mansions, Hong Kong Island
- Tai O Heritage Hotel, Tai O
- Po Fook Hill Elevator, Sha Tin

==== Macau ====
- Taipa Houses–Museum, Taipa, Macau

=== Japan ===
In addition, slope cars (small monorails running on rack rails), of which more than 80 have been installed across Japan, are also legally classified as inclined elevators under Japanese law.

==== Hokkaido ====
- Sapporo City Transportation Bureau Mount Moiwa Mini Cablecar, Sapporo, Hokkaido

==== Kantō ====
- Manza Prince Hotel, Tsumagoi, Gunma
- Transfer passage between Akasaka-mitsuke Station and Nagatachō Station, Minato / Chiyoda, Tokyo
- Kamakura Prince Hotel, Kamakura, Kanagawa
- Rune Kamihoshikawa, Yokohama, Kanagawa - Residents only

==== Chūbu ====
- Climbing Car, Yahikoyama Ropeway. Yahiko, Niigata
- Echigo Hillside National Government Park, Nagaoka, Niigata
- Shikibu Onsen Yurari, Echizen, Fukui
- Commore Bridge, Commore Shiotsu. Uenohara, Yamanashi
- Kōfu Station South Exit Elevator, Kōfu, Yamanashi
- Hotel Kusakabe Armeria, Gero Onsen. Gero, Gifu
- Atami Pasania Club, Atami, Shizuoka
- Tsumakoi Resort Sainosato Hotel South Wing, Kakegawa, Shizuoka
- Higashiyama Zoo and Botanical Gardens, Nagoya, Aichi
- Sakae Station, Nagoya, Aichi

==== Kansai ====
- Gunze Town Center Tsukashin, Amagasaki, Hyōgo
- Hanayama Green Elevator (Skylator), Hanayama Higashi Danchi, Kobe, Hyōgo - The first inclined elevator in Japan, installed in 1984
- La Vista Takarazuka, Takarazuka, Hyōgo
- Nishinomiya Najio New Town, Nishinomiya, Hyōgo
- Seaside Hotel Maiko Villa, Kobe, Hyōgo
- Yamate Kansen road Ashiyagawa Tunnel, Ashiya, Hyōgo

==== Kyūshū ====
- Karatsu Castle, Karatsu, Saga
- Saga Station, Saga, Saga
- Nagasaki City Aioimachi Uedamachi Road 2 (Glover Sky Road), Nagasaki, Nagasaki
- Shamen Isō System (Slope Transfer System), Nagasaki, Nagasaki. A telephone-booth-shaped suspension railway that is treated as inclined elevator.
- Nakatsu Station, Nakatsu, Ōita
- Sojo University Ikeda Campus, Kumamoto, Kumamoto
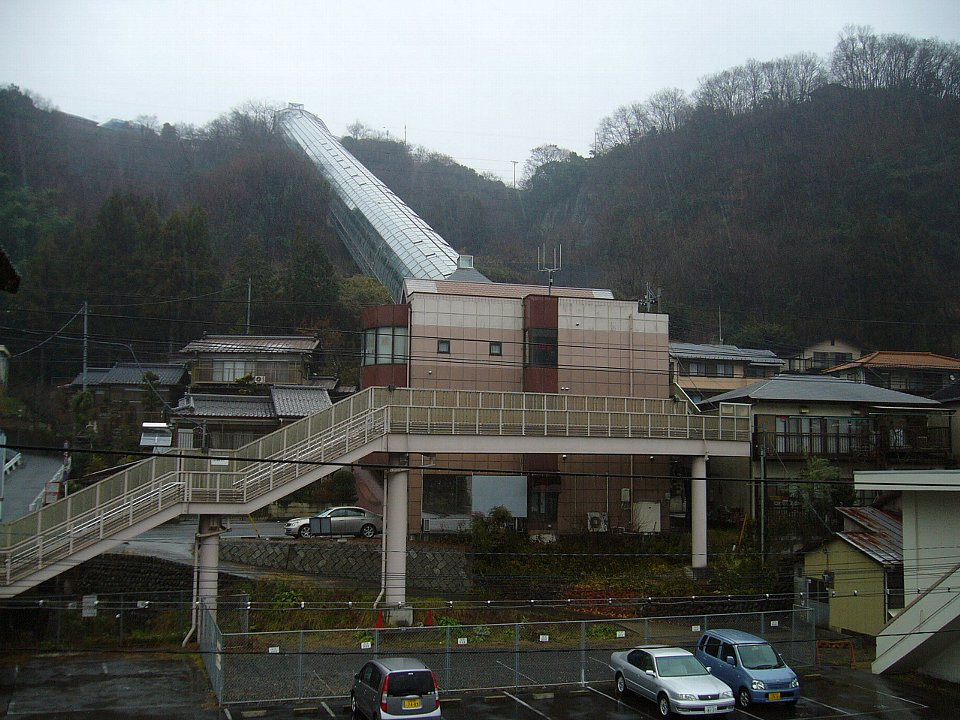
Commore Bridge of Commore Shiotsu, Uenohara, Yamanashi.

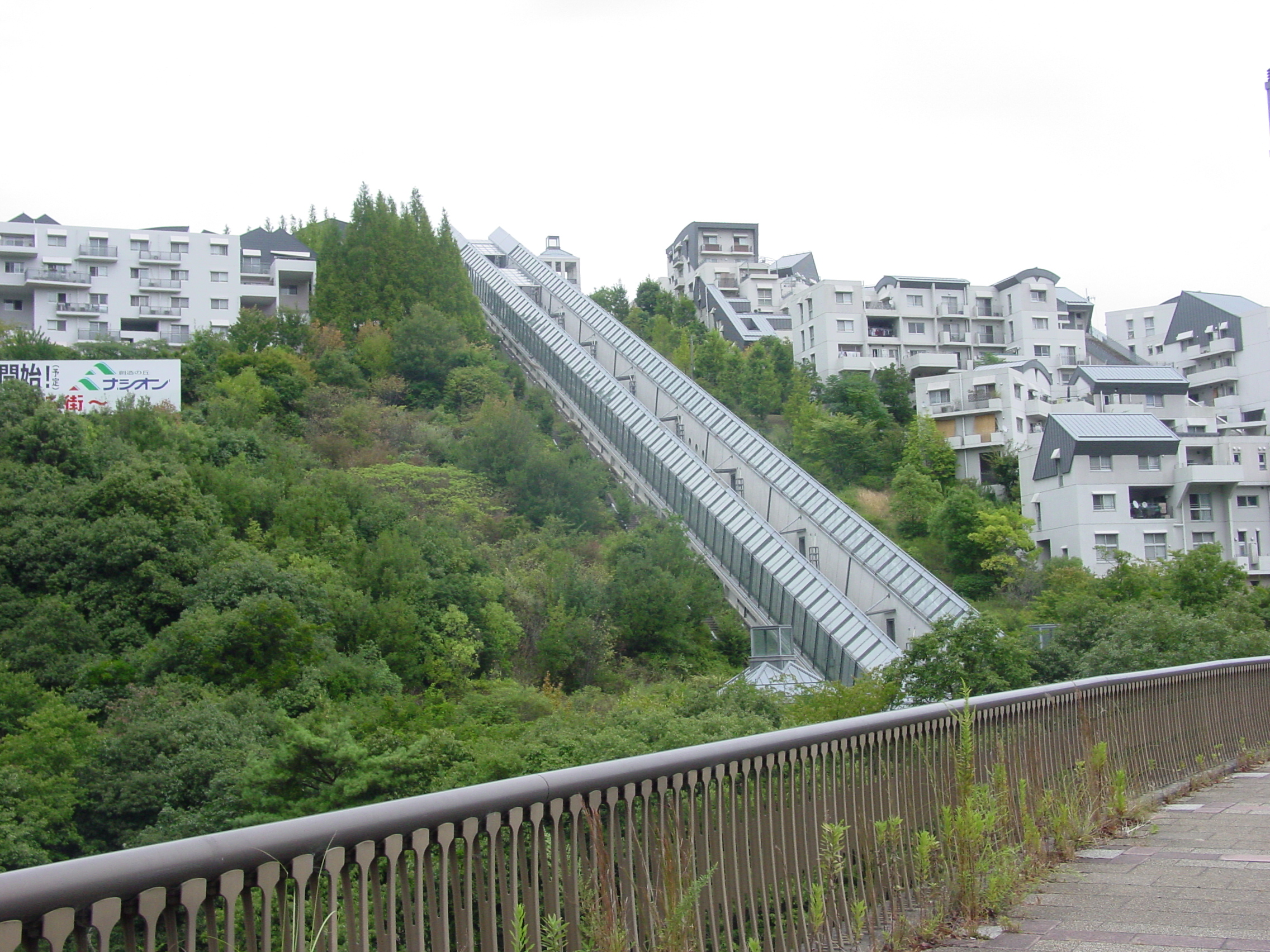
Nishinomiya Najio New Town, Nishinomiya, Hyōgo.

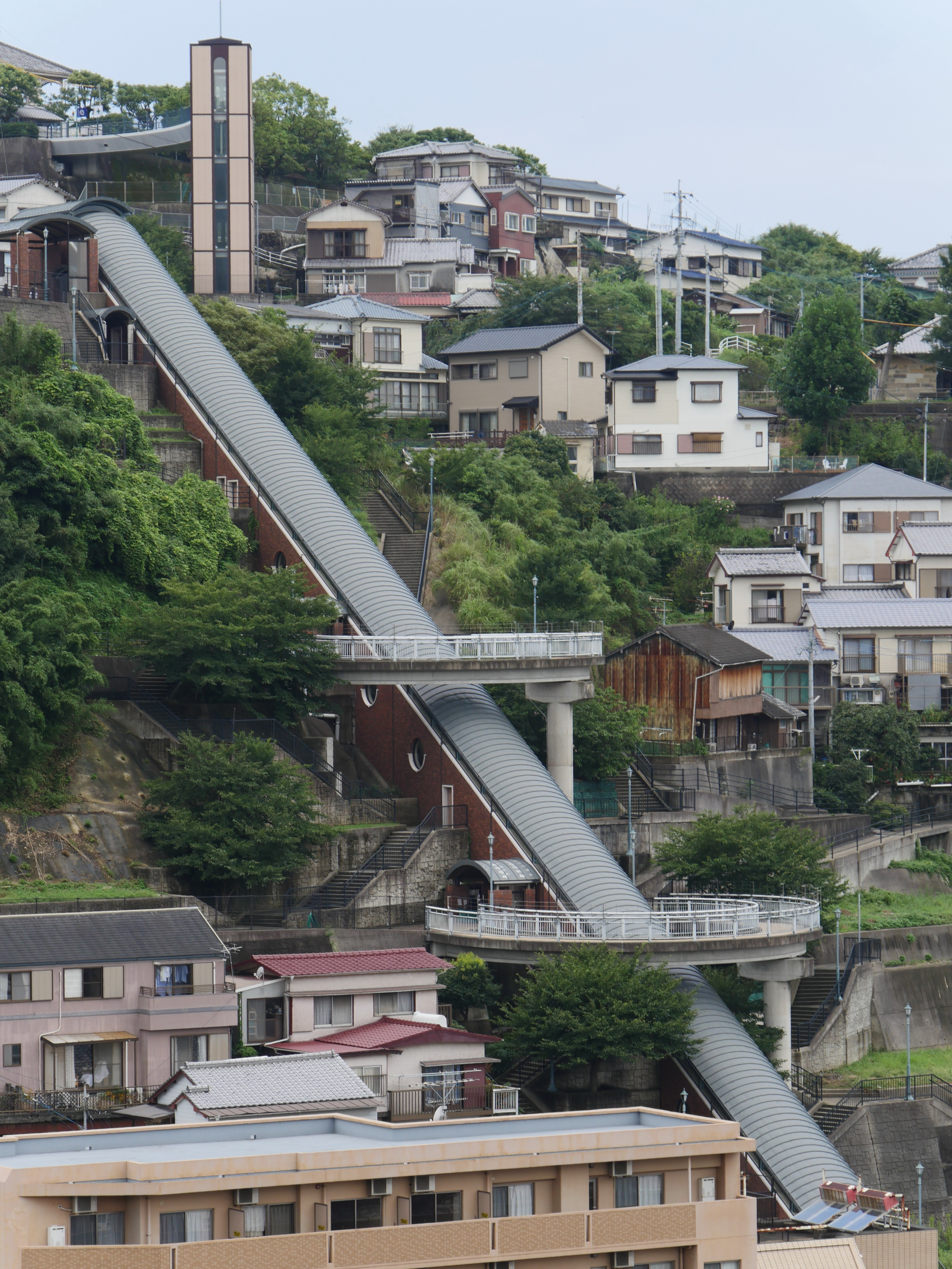
Glover Sky Road, Nagasaki, Nagasaki.

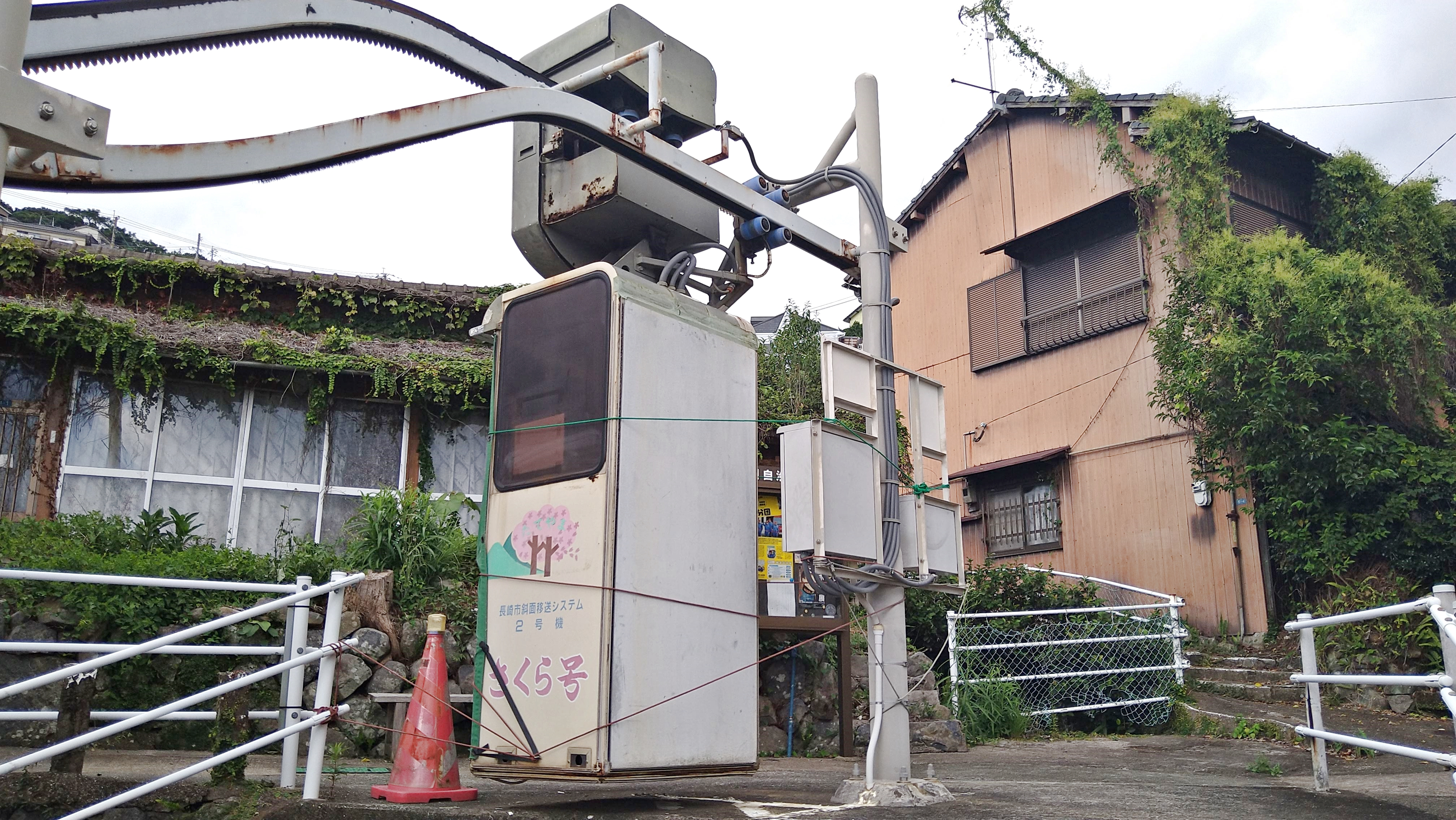
Shamen Isō System, Nagasaki, Nagasaki.

=== Malaysia ===
- Kek Lok Si Temple, Penang

=== Philippines ===
- Tagaytay Highlands, Tagaytay, Philippines (referred to as funicular)
- The Belle View, Tagaytay Highlands, Tagaytay, Philippines.

=== Singapore ===
- The Palisades

=== South Korea ===
- Namsan Oreumi Elevator, Seoul

=== Thailand ===
- Wat Phra That Doi Suthep, Chiang Mai
- Khao Tang Kuan, Songkhla

== Europe ==
=== Austria ===
- Agathenhof connection between the Mandalahaus hotel complex and the Oasenbad bathing area, Micheldorf, Carinthia
- Burg Güssing castle, Güssing, Burgenland
- Bergisel Ski Jump, Innsbruck
- Ehrenberg Castle, Reutte, Tyrol
- Hochosterwitz Castle, Launsdorf, Carinthia
- Hohenwerfen Castle, Werfen, Salzburg
- Innerwald Shuttle, Sölden, Tyrol
- Lärchwandschrägaufzug, High Tauern National Park, Kaprun, Austria (Second-widest gauge railway in the world with gauge of 8,200 mm (26 ft 10 27/32 in))
- Mein Wurmkogel Hotel Snow Cab to ski jump, Sölden/Hochgurgl, Tyrol
- Planai-Hochwurzen-Bahnen Hopsi Express, Schladming, Styria
- Private Villa, Vienna
- Residential lift, Zell am See, Salzburg
- Riegersburg Castle, Riegersburg, Styria
- Therma Nova to Hotel connection, Köflach, Styria
- Toni-Seelos-Olympiaschanze ski jump, Seefeld, Tyrol
- Zelfenschanze Inclined Lift, Montafon Nordic Sportzentrum, Tschagguns, Vorarlberg (variable inclination)

=== Croatia ===
- Hotel President, Dubrovnik

=== Czech Republic ===
- Mrazovka Funicular, connecting the two parts of the Mövenpick Hotel, Smíchov district, Prague

=== Denmark ===
- Mountain Dwellings, Copenhagen
- Viborg hospital Cityliner, Viborg

=== Finland ===
- Kakola Funicular in Turku
- Koli National Park (short funicular from parking area to the nature centre)
- Helsinki metro stations: Sörnäinen, Hakaniemi, University of Helsinki, Central railway station, Lauttasaari, Koivusaari and Aalto University.

=== France ===
- Eiffel Tower, Paris
- Grand-Hôtel du Cap-Ferrat, French Riviera
- Guerville
- Les Deux Alpes glacier inclined lift
- Montmartre Funicular, Paris (converted from funicular to inclined elevator in 1991)
- Rocamadour inclined elevator
- Saint-Lazare (Paris Metro), Paris
- Tréport funicular, Tréport, Normandy
- University residence on rue de la Tomb-Issoire, Paris

=== Georgia ===
- Mount Didveli ski resort, Bakuriani

=== Germany ===
- Dockland, 35 m High office Building, Hamburg with two systems
- Erdinger Arena ski jump, Oberstdorf, Bavaria
- Göhren Inclined Lift, Göhren, Isle of Rügen, Mecklenburg-Vorpommern
- Heini-Klopfer-Skiflugschanze ski jump, Oberstdorf, Bavaria
- Mühlenkopfschanze ski jump, Willingen, Hesse
- New Town Hall, Hanover (variable inclination)
- Philosophenweg, Heidelberg
- Schlossberg, Schwarzenberg
- Schrägaufzug at the Ehrenbreitstein Fortress, Koblenz
- Seebrücke Sellin Pier, Sellin, Isle of Rügen, Mecklenburg-Vorpommern
- Inclined Elevator Sport, Schattenbergschanze;Oberstdorf, Bavaria
- Monberg Inclined Elevator, Monheim, Nordrhein-Westfalen
- Olympic ski jump, Garmisch-Partenkirchen, Bavaria
- Dombergbahn, Freising, Bavaria

=== Greece ===
Many seaside resorts and hotels in Crete contain inclined elevators within the resort grounds.

=== Italy ===
- Conca di Cheneil Inclined Lift, Valtournenche, Aosta Valley
- Private residence at Pineta di Arenzano, Arenzano
- Convention Hall Inclined Lift, Bassano del Grappa
- Fort Bard, Aosta
- Inclined Panoramic Lift, Villa Carlotta, Lake Como
- Mergellina, Naples Metro, Naples
- Verona funicular, Verona
- Quezzi inclined elevator, Genova
- Renzo Piano Atelier, Genova
- Sanctuary of Our Lady of Montallegro, Rapallo
- Villa Scassi, Genova

=== Latvia ===
- Riga Radio and TV Tower, Riga

=== Lithuania ===
- Gediminas Hill Lift, Vilnius

=== Norway ===
- DNB ASA Headquarters, Oslo
- Holmenkollbakken ski jump, Oslo
- Nationaltheatret station (Parkveien entrance), Oslo

=== Portugal ===
- Goldra Park Elevator, Covilhã
- Santo Andre Elevator, Covilhã

=== Romania ===
- Fortress of Deva, Deva (variable inclination)
- Râșnov Citadel, Râșnov

=== Russian Federation ===
- Grozny Inclined Lift, Grozny, Chechnia

=== Slovakia ===
- Biela Púť ski resort, Jasna Low Tatras

=== Slovenia ===
- Ljubljana Castle funicular, Ljubljana
- Škocjan Caves Regional Park

=== Spain ===
- Bahia Blanca, Gran Canaria
- Inclined Lifts, Bilbao
- Kukullaga station, Bilbao Metro Line 3, Etxebarri
- Riosol Island of Stars Hotel, Mogán

=== Sweden ===
- Ericsson Globe, Stockholm (variable inclination)

=== Switzerland ===
Map of the inclined elevators

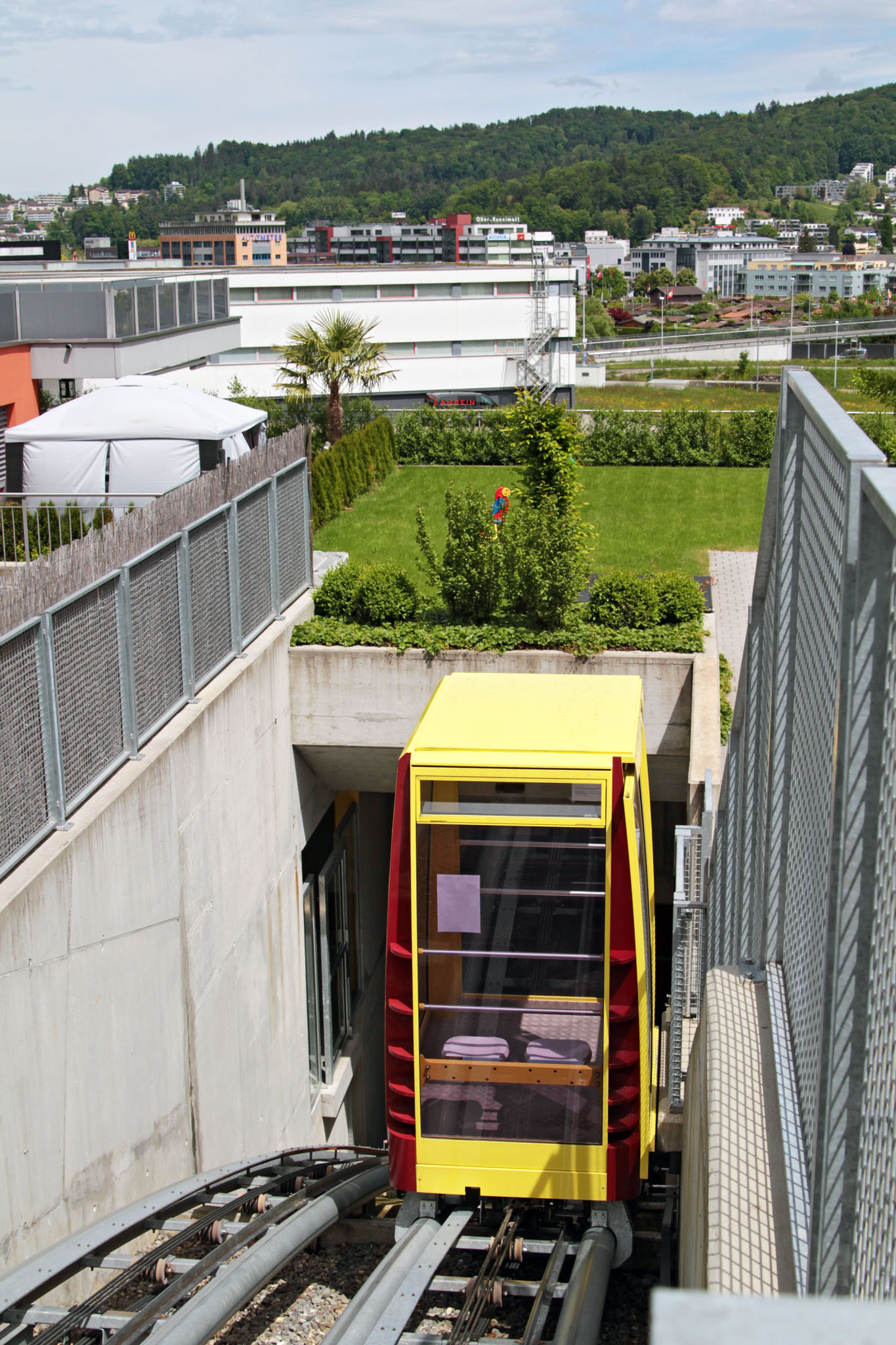
Near the lower station, Schräglift Wiggenhalde in Kriens (2013)

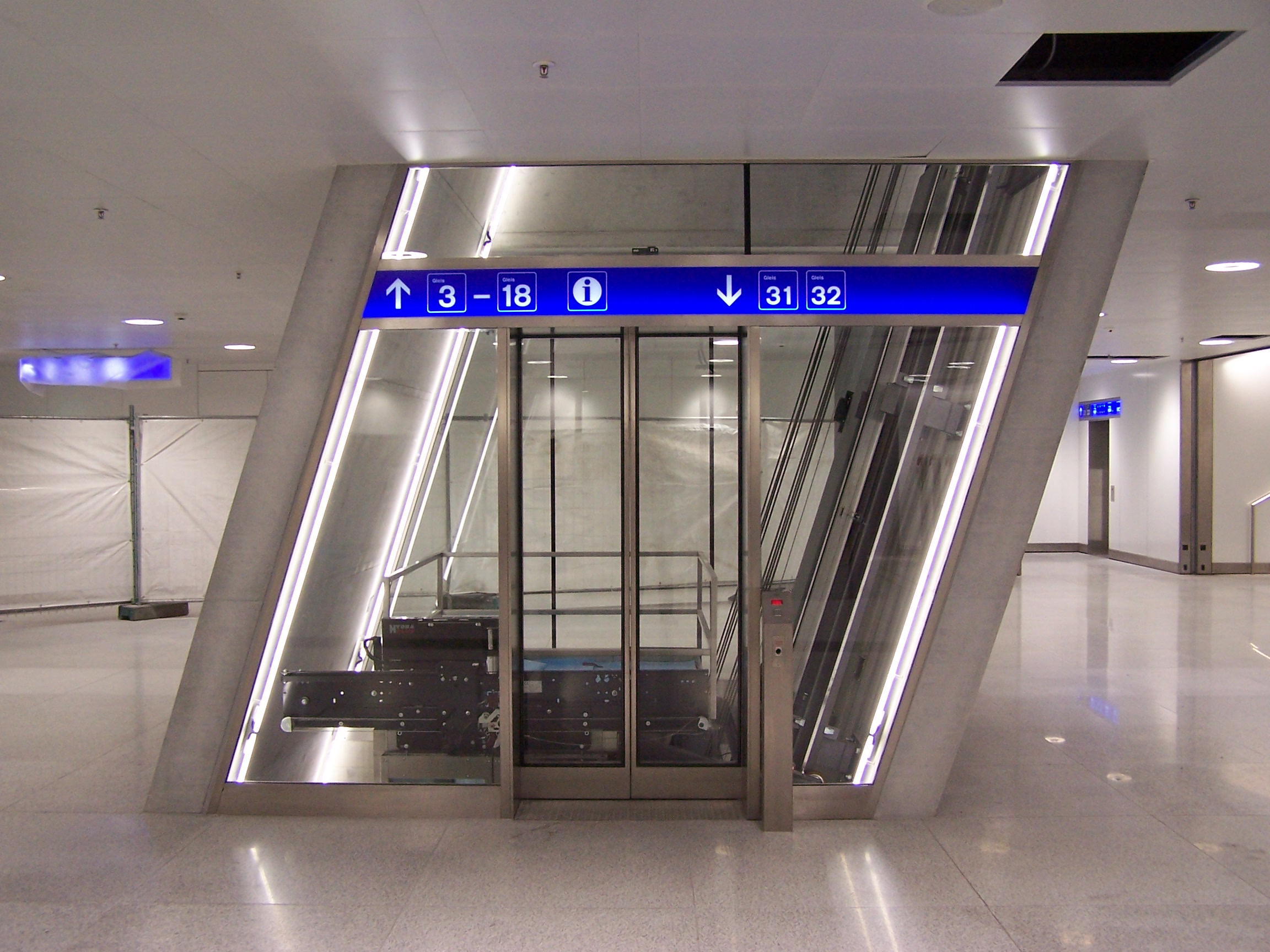
inclined elevator at Zürich Hauptbahnhof (2014)

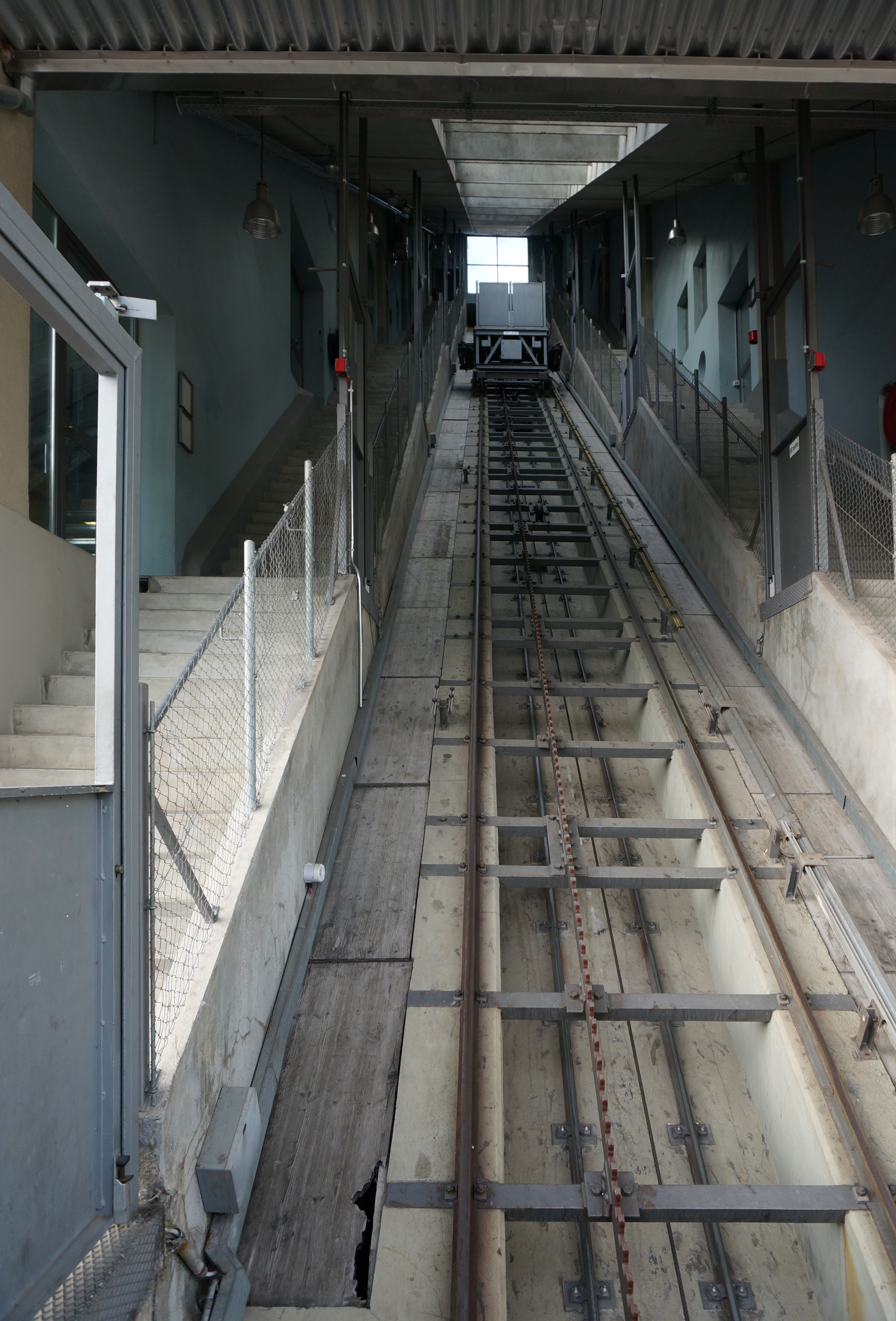
inclined lift at Stufenbau, Ittigen (2013)

- Hungerberg, Aarau AG: 2015, 47.396418°N 8.035918°E
- Tschuggen Express, Tschuggen Grand Hotel, Arosa GR: 2018, length: 536 m, diff. elevation: 154 m, private, outdoors, (replaces monorail from 2009) 46.777311°N 9.668011°E
- Weisshorn, Arosa GR: 2012, indoors,
- Collinetta, Ascona TI:
- Rebhaldenstrasse, Bassersdorf ZH: private, outdoors, 47.447941°N 8.626521°E
- Spital Belp, Belp BE: 1991, length: 49 m, diff. elevation: 28 m, 4 persons, outdoors, 46.892351°N 7.495371°E
- Hargarten, Belp BE: private, outdoors, 46.870211°N 7.505031°E
- Lindenrain, Belp BE: 1969, private, outdoors, 46.89452°N 7.492912°E
- Bärenbähnli, Bärenpark, Bern BE: 2015, length: 43.3 m, diff. elevation: 20.5 m, 15 persons, outdoors, [c] 46.947131°N 7.458821°E
- Schräglift Alpmatten, Alpmatten, Bettmeralp VS: 2000, 8 persons, with counterweight, outdoors, (initially known as "Schräglift Mieschgihalta") [c] 46.389071°N 8.063401°E
- Reuchenette-Strasse/Route de Reuchenette, Biel/Bienne BE: 47.152339°N 7.260859°E
- Via alle Vigne, Brè sopra Locarno TI: outdoors, 46.173281°N 8.769691°E
- Aeschenbrunnmattstrasse, Bremgarten bei Bern BE: private, outdoors, 46.98708°N 7.441958°E
- Terrassensiedlung Ländlistrasse 60, Bremgarten bei Bern BE: private, outdoors, 46.973351°N 7.433001°E
- Terrassensiedlung Ländlistrasse 70, Bremgarten bei Bern BE: private, outdoors, 46.973741°N 7.432341°E
- Herrenmatt, Brugg AG: private, 47.487383°N 8.206213°E
- Terrassensiedlung Mühlehalde, Umikon, Brugg AG: private, indoors, 47.485371°N 8.197251°E
- Rebmoosweg 41, Brugg AG: private, outdoors, 47.491151°N 8.214991°E
- Rebmoosweg 75, Brugg AG: private, outdoors, 47.492821°N 8.218051°E
- Residenza al Ronco, via Strécia, Cadempino TI: private, outdoors, 46.035941°N 8.935431°E
- Molino Dam, Calanca GR: 1958/2017, length: 52 m, private, in tunnel, (funicular IKSS, incline 38°) 46.267801°N 9.110081°E
- Weinbergtreppe Chur, Chur GR: outdoors, 46.847191°N 9.536651°E
- Plans-Mayens, Crans-Montana VS: 1970, length: 43 m, private, outdoors, (maximum incline 57%)
- Via al Böcc, Massarescio, Cugnasco-Gerra TI: outdoors, 46.177238°N 8.929058°E
- Bombinasco, Curio TI: outdoors, (suspended) 46.0137°N 8.8329°E
- Scarlett-Sura, Buolstrasse, Davos GR: private, indoors,
- Häsiweg 9, Erlinsbach AG: private, outdoors, 47.397180°N 8.021329°E
- Sugenreben 3a, Erlinsbach AG: private, outdoors, 47.39689°N 8.01382°E
- Sugenreben 5, Erlinsbach AG: private, outdoors, 47.39692°N 8.013812°E
- Sugenreben 41, Erlinsbach AG: private, outdoors, 47.39758°N 8.01870°E
- Reformierte Kirche Felsberg GR, Felsberg GR: outdoors, 46.845572°N 9.470012°E
- Stutzstrasse, Schindellegi, Feusisberg SZ: 2016, private, outdoors, (under staircase)
- Caumasee-Lift, Caumasee, Flims GR: 1937, 1990, length: 125 m, diff. elevation: 72 m, each 12 persons, outdoors, (pair) [c] [d] 46.821971°N 9.295221°E
- La Scala Terrassenhaus, Hügelweg, Galgenen SZ: private, outdoors, 47.173492°N 8.877892°E
- Sonnenhügel, Glarus GL: private, 47.046854°N 9.063454°E
- Altstaffel-Griessee, Goms VS: length: 800 m, private, in tunnel, 46.47242°N 8.36932°E
- Standseilbahn Handegg–Wasserschloss Handeggfluh Ärlen, Kraftwerk Handegg II, Guttannen BE: 1948-2015, length: 867 m, diff. elevation: 270 m, 20 persons, private, outdoors, [c] 46.612722°N 8.306471°E
- Hoher Kasten, SG/AI: in tunnel, 47.283801°N 9.485081°E
- Stufenbau, Pulverstrasse, Ittigen BE: indoors, 46.977241°N 7.469141°E
- Standseilbahn Urweid–Chapf, Kraftwerk Innertkirchen I, Innertkirchen BE: 1950, length: 1030 m, diff. elevation: 608 m, 12 persons, private, outdoors, 46.687930°N 8.244570°E
- Nordic Arena, Kandersteg BE: 2016, length: 214, 8 persons, outdoors, (to access ski jump, a funicular per FOT) 46.506262°N 7.680932°E
- Haldenweg, Klingnau AG: 47.581963°N 8.255223°E
- Parkbahn, Zurich Airport The Circle, Kloten ZH: 2020, 15 persons, outdoors, (funicular per FOT) [c] [d] 47.450311°N 8.565811°E
- Wiggenhalde, Kriens LU: 2009, length: 108 m and 84 m, private, outdoors, (pair) [c] 47.021611°N 8.292511°E 47.021241°N 8.291240°E
- Burghaldeweg, Küttigen AG: outdoors, 47.412384°N 8.057664°E
- Kirchberggasse, Küttigen AG: outdoors, 47.41136°N 8.05829°E
- Schwanau Island, Lauerz SZ: outdoors, 47.03226°N 8.59695°E
- Tunnel lift, Trümmelbach Falls, Lauterbrunnen BE: 1913/1964/1983, length: 98 m, diff. elevation: 71 m, with counterweight, in tunnel, [c] [d] 46.56998°N 7.91329°E
- Brunnmattstrasse, Lenzburg BE: 47.380626°N 8.183236°E
- Alex Express, Hotel Alex, Leukerbad VS: private, outdoors, 46.37438°N 7.62843°E
- Leisenberg, Liestal BL: 47.4855°N 7.7482°E
- Skytrain, SHMS/Belvédère, Leysin VD: 2004, length: 63 m, diff. elevation: 14 m, outdoors, 46.345081°N 7.010691°E
- Le Remontoir, Le Locle railway station, Le Locle NE: 2014, length: 62 m, diff. elevation: 24 m, outdoors, 47.057045°N 6.746255°E
- Via Lusciago, Arcegno, Losone TI: outdoors, 46.170443°N 8.755473°E
- Gütschlift, Chateau Gütsch, Lucerne LU: 2015 (as inclined elevator), length: 170 m, diff. elevation: 90 m, outdoors, (pair) [c] 47.051991°N 8.297061°E
- Standseilbahn Hotel Montana, Hotel Montana, Lucerne LU: 1910/1987, length: 85 m, diff. elevation: 38 m, 15 persons, with counterweight, [c] [d] 47.055762°N 8.319933°E
- degli Angioli, Lugano TI: 1913-1986, length: 142 m, with counterweight, outdoors, [c] 46.000161°N 8.949231°E
- Private residence, Lugano TI: length: 40 m, 8 persons, private, outdoors,
- Villa Pescali, Lugano TI: private, indoors,
- Fulmignano, Ruvigliana, Lugano TI: outdoors, 46.00324°N 8.98112°E
- Uptown Mels Development, Mels SG: outdoors, 47.043521°N 9.415492°E
- Via delle Vigne, Minusio TI: outdoors, 46.18022°N 8.82089°E
- Power plant, Montcherand VD:
- Mer de Glace, Nendaz VS: 2012, length: 65 m, diff. elevation: 35 m, each 12 persons, (pair, also known as "Funiculaire Ecluses-Tracouet") 46.18092°N 7.29056°E
- Kraftwerk Herrentöbeli, Nesslau SG: private, outdoors, 47.245202°N 9.177682°E
- Rue Georges-Auguste Matile 5, Neuchâtel NE: private, outdoors, 46.998584°N 6.933814°E
- Rondchâtel Papeteries, Péry-La Heutte BE: private, outdoors, (industrial, former) 47.173359°N 7.248358°E 47.173209°N 7.245911°E
- Eichholzstrasse, Pfäffikon ZH: private, outdoors,
- Clos des Moines, Puidoux VD: outdoors, 46.4815°N 6.7592°E
- Standseilbahn Lochezen, Lochezen, Unterterzen, Quarten SG: 1956, length: 240 m, diff. elevation: 150 m, private, outdoors, 47.129592°N 9.283672°E
- Mühlenerstrasse, Rebstein SG: 47.401719°N 9.587459°E
- Lindenbüel, Rehetobel AR: 47.428258°N 9.483478°E
- Burg Alt-Rheineck, Rheineck SG: outdoors, 47.46616°N 9.58921°E
- Schräglift Ringgenberg, Ringgenberg Castle and church, Ringgenberg BE: 2009, length: 29 m, diff. elevation: 11 m, 46.700721°N 7.896131°E
- Via Barcone, Ronco sopra Ascona TI:
- Via Fontana Martina, Ronco sopra Ascona TI:
- Mühleggbahn, St. Gallen SG: 1975, length: 323 m, 38 persons, in tunnel, (earlier a rack railway and a 2-car funicular) [c] [d] 47.419531°N 9.379552°E
- Walzenhausenstrasse, St. Margrethen SG: private, outdoors, 47.449220°N 9.627611°E
- Areal Tinus, St. Moritz GR: 2019,
- Palace Hotel, St. Moritz GR: 1913-1922, outdoors, (suspended, no longer exists)
- Parkhaus Serletta, St. Moritz GR: indoors, 46.496841°N 9.841791°E
- Hostett, Oberwilen, Sarnen OW: private, outdoors, 46.867487°N 8.197687°E
- Tigignas, Savognin GR: 2001, length: 82 m, diff. elevation: 10 m, outdoors, 46.594511°N 9.570551°E
- Haldenwiesli, Herblingen, Schaffhausen SH: 2018, length: 52 m, diff. elevation: 18 m, 6 persons, private, outdoors, 47.723120°N 8.666465°E
- Lindliberg, Schaffhausen SH:
- Lindliweg, Schaffhausen SH: 47.693151°N 8.651081°E
- Sonnenberg, Schaffhausen SH: 47.718572°N 8.653432°E
- Klein Rigi Metro, Thurbruggstrasse 31, Schönenberg an der Thur TG: 1999, length: 80 m, diff. elevation: 17 m, indoors, 47.517921°N 9.198041°E
- Schönberg, Gunten, Sigriswil BE: 46.713962°N 7.698762°E
- Rue du Puits-du-Géant, Sion VS: 46.22522°N 7.33331°E
- rue Gravelone/Pré d'Amédée, Sion VS: 46.234989°N 7.354329°E
- Combe des Serpents, Molignon, Sion VS: 2017 (replacement), length: 32 m, diff. elevation: 15 m, 4 persons, private, outdoors, 46.248162°N 7.391972°E
- Molignon, Sion VS: private, outdoors,
- Schrägaufzug Brändlisberg, Traubenweg, Steffisburg BE: 1984 (replacement 2012), length: 202 m, private, indoors, (two identical parallel shafts with convex inclination change, longest in Europe when built)
- Dorfhalde, Steffisburg BE: 2017 (replacement), length: 103 m, diff. elevation: 31 m, private, outdoors, 46.766014°N 7.632124°E
- Ortbühlweg, Steffisburg BE: 1992, 2017 (replacement), length: 62 m, diff. elevation: 22 m, 10 persons, private, indoors, 46.781612°N 7.631522°E
- Höhenrad, Bernstrasse, Stettlen BE: 2020 (replacement), length: 40 m, diff. elevation: 18 m, 8 persons, private, outdoors, 46.958091°N 7.531521°E
- Räbgässli, Thierachern BE: private, outdoors, 46.755133°N 7.578733°E
- Les Matins de St. Laurent, La Tzoumaz VS: outdoors, 46.142417°N 7.235027°E
- Utzigen, Unterer Rainweg, Vechigen BE: private, outdoors, 46.95376°N 7.56071°E
- Rötiboden, Wädenswil ZH: 1979, length: 43 m, 10 persons, with counterweight, private, (first on left short of Lake Zürich)
- Schräglift Webermühle, Webermühle, Wettingen AG: Sept 2016, diff. elevation: 20 m, outdoors, 47.458192°N 8.315092°E
- Schlosshofstrasse, Brühlberg, Winterthur ZH: private, indoors, (several) 47.496759°N 8.703509°E
- Leisee Shuttle, Leisee, Zermatt VS: length: 80 m, diff. elevation: 43 m, outdoors, (pair) [c] 46.01623°N 7.77109°E
- Zürich Hauptbahnhof/Bahnhof Löwenstrasse, Zürich ZH: indoors, (several elevators) [c] 47.3775°N 8.5402°E

=== Ukraine ===
- Odessa Funicular, Odessa

=== United Kingdom ===
==== England ====
- Blists Hill Victorian Town, Madeley, Shropshire
- Greenford station, London
- Millennium Inclinator, London
- National Football Museum in the Urbis, Manchester
- Royal National Lifeboat Institution Padstow Lifeboat Station, Mother Ivy's Bay, Cornwall
- Liverpool Street, connecting the Elizabeth line platforms to the National Rail platforms, Greater London
- Farringdon, connecting the Elizabeth line platforms to the Lindsey Street / Barbican exit near Charterhouse Square, Greater London
- Southend Cliff Railway, Southend-on-Sea - often incorrectly described as a funicular.
- Tyne cyclist and pedestrian tunnels, connecting Jarrow and Howdon, Tyne and Wear (under construction)

==== Wales ====
- Ebbw Vale, Blaenau Gwent

==== Isle of Man ====
- Douglas, Second Falcon Cliff Lift (1927–1990)

== Middle East ==
=== Saudi Arabia ===
- The Headquarters Business Park Tower, Jeddah

=== Turkey ===
- Karabük Municipality 2 Duplex units in-Tunnel Inclined Elevator, Karabük
- Kiremitliktepe Ski Jump, Erzurum
- Bodrum

== Oceania ==
=== Australia ===
- Scenic World Railway, Katoomba, New South Wales
- Cataract Gorge, Launceston, Tasmania.

== See also ==
- List of funicular railways
