= Hotel Montana =

The Hotel Montana may refer to

- The Hôtel Montana in Haiti
- The Standseilbahn Hotel Montana that leads to the Hotel Montana (Lucerne) in Lucerne, Switzerland
- The Montana Hotel in Anaconda, Montana
