= Po Fook Hill Elevator =

Inclined elevator in Sha Tin, Hong Kong

Coordinates: 22.3862°N 114.1863°E

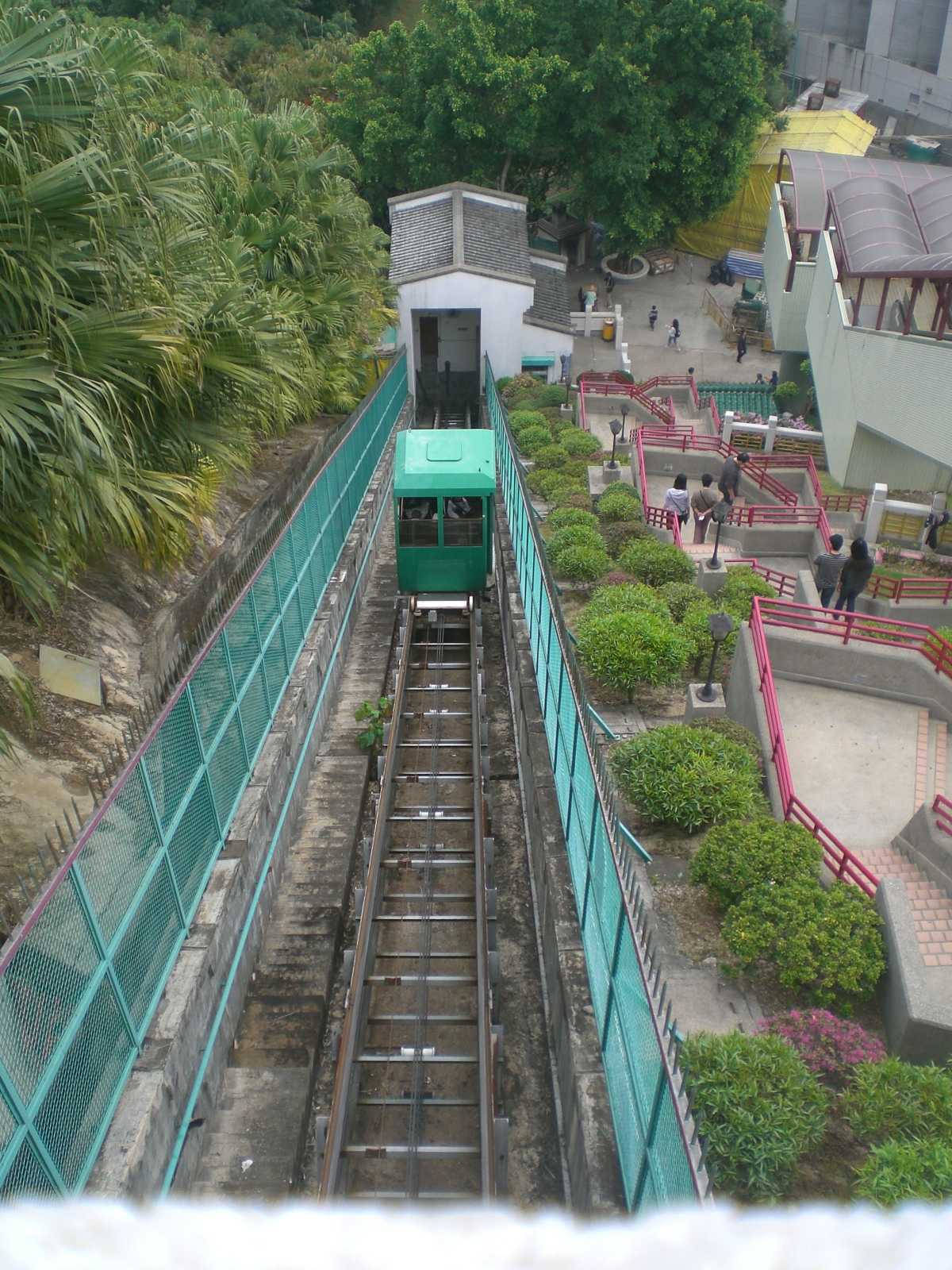
Po Fook Hill Elevator

The Po Fook Hill Elevator is an inclined elevator located inside the Po Fook Hill Ancestral Hall (Chinese: 寶福山) in Sha Tin, Hong Kong.

The system has two stations and a single cabin built by Gangloff of Switzerland; the car can accommodate 10 (6 seated passengers on two wooden benches and 4 standees) and is free of charge. The cabin uses lift buttons operated by the passengers in the cabin and intercom to provide communication if there are operating issues.

== See also ==
- List of inclined elevators
