= Ljubljana Castle funicular =

Funicular railway in Ljubljana, Slovenia

Coordinates: 46°3′0.44″N 14°30′34.99″E

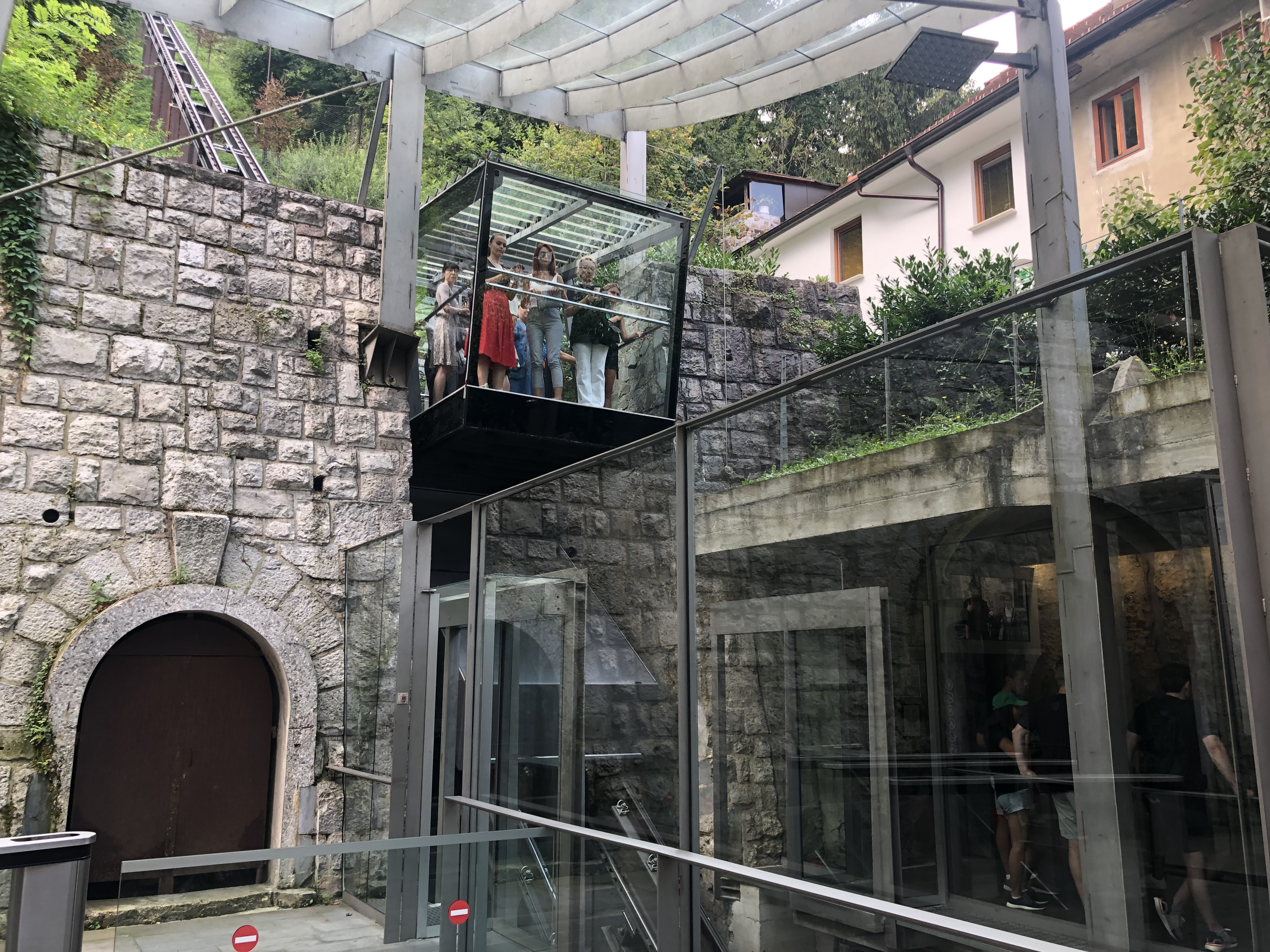

Overview
- Locale: Ljubljana, Slovenia
- Dates of operation: 2006–present

Technical
- Length: 70 metres (230 ft)

Other
- Website: ljubljanskigrad.si

Ljubljana Castle Funicular

The Ljubljana Castle Funicular is an inclined elevator in Ljubljana, the capital of Slovenia. It goes from Krek Square near the Ljubljana Central Market to the Ljubljana Castle. The idea of having a funicular going to the castle dates back to 1897, when then mayor Ivan Hribar wrote to the Austro-Hungarian authorities asking for a lift that would go up to the castle. The Funicular was designed as part of renovation of Ljubljana Castle by the Ambient - Architecture Firm (architects: Edo Ravnikar jr., Miha Kerin, Majda Kregar). It was realised on 28 December 2006. The funicular is popular among tourists. It runs between the hours of 10:00 and 21:00 in wintertime, and the hours of 10:00 and 22:00 in summertime, and the full trip lasts 60 seconds.

== Gallery ==
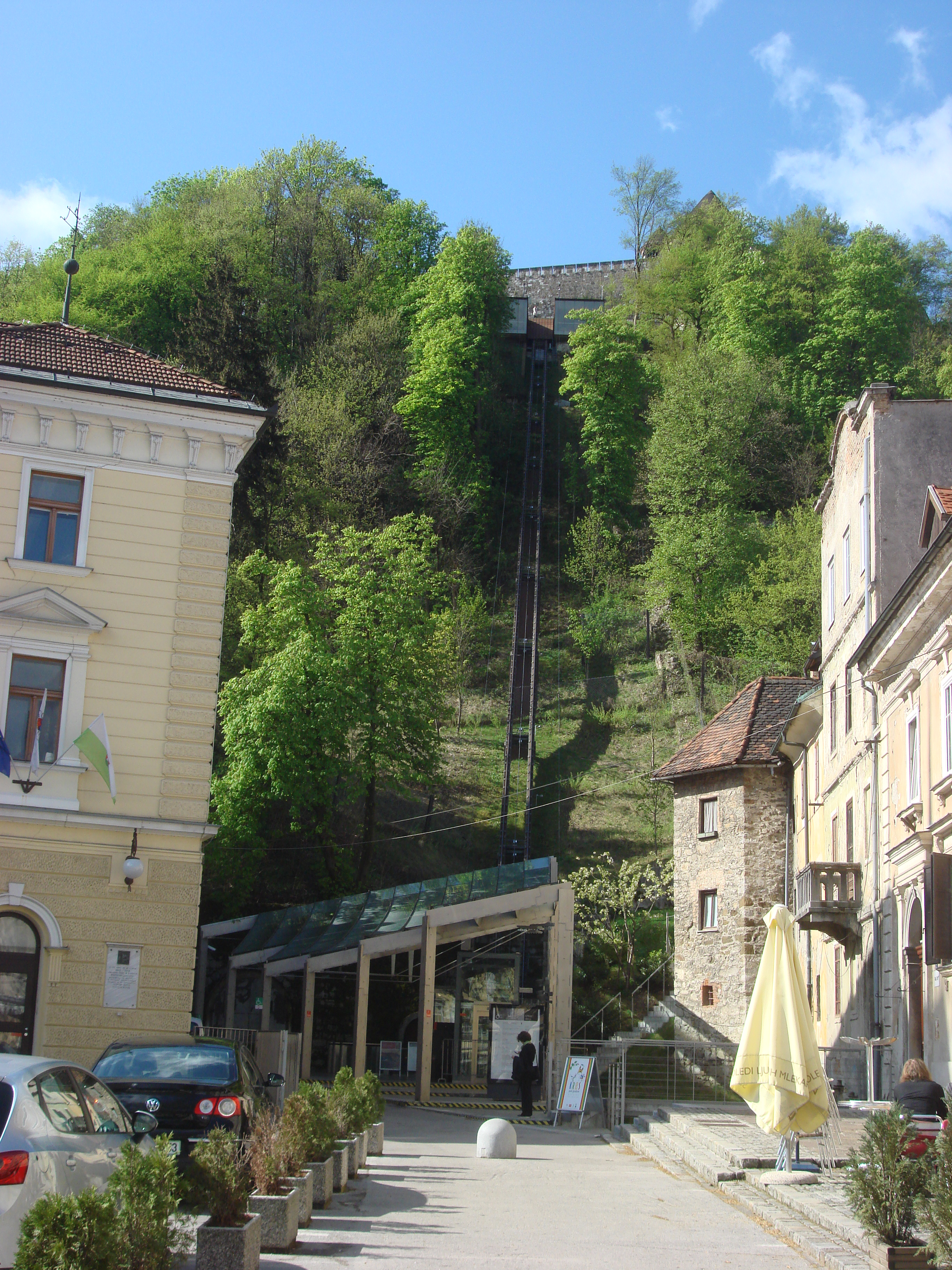
Bottom station and funicular track from Krek Square

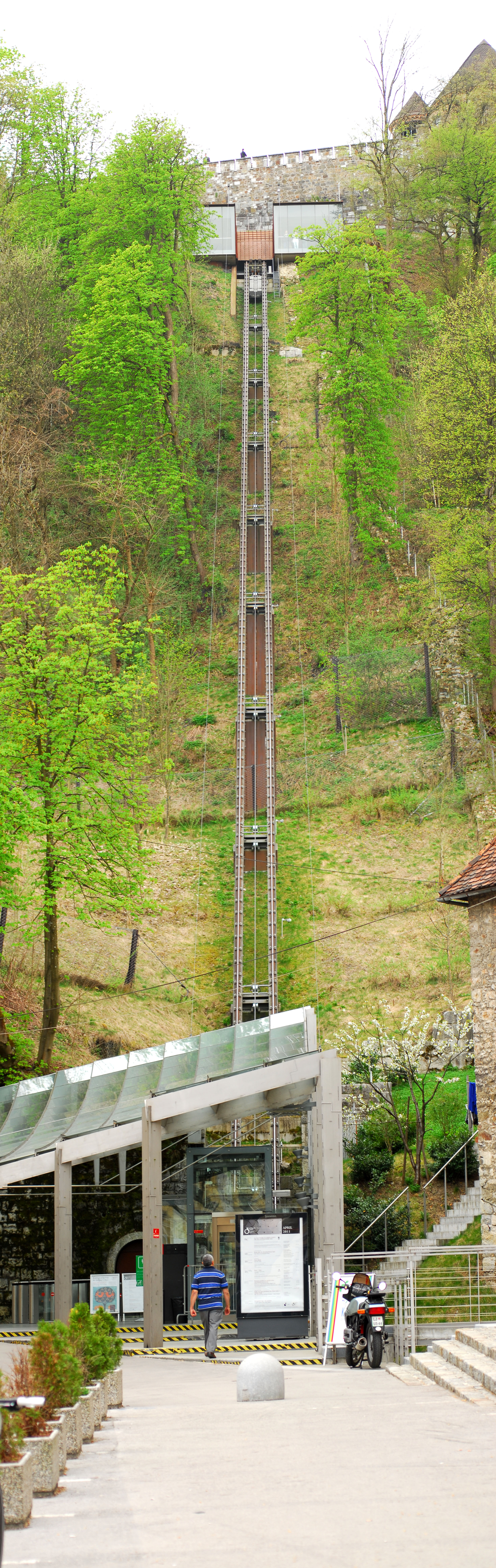
A cable car to Ljubljana Castle

== See also ==
- List of inclined elevators
