= Strand Beach Elevator =

Inclined elevator in Dana Point, California, United States

Strand Beach Funicular Access
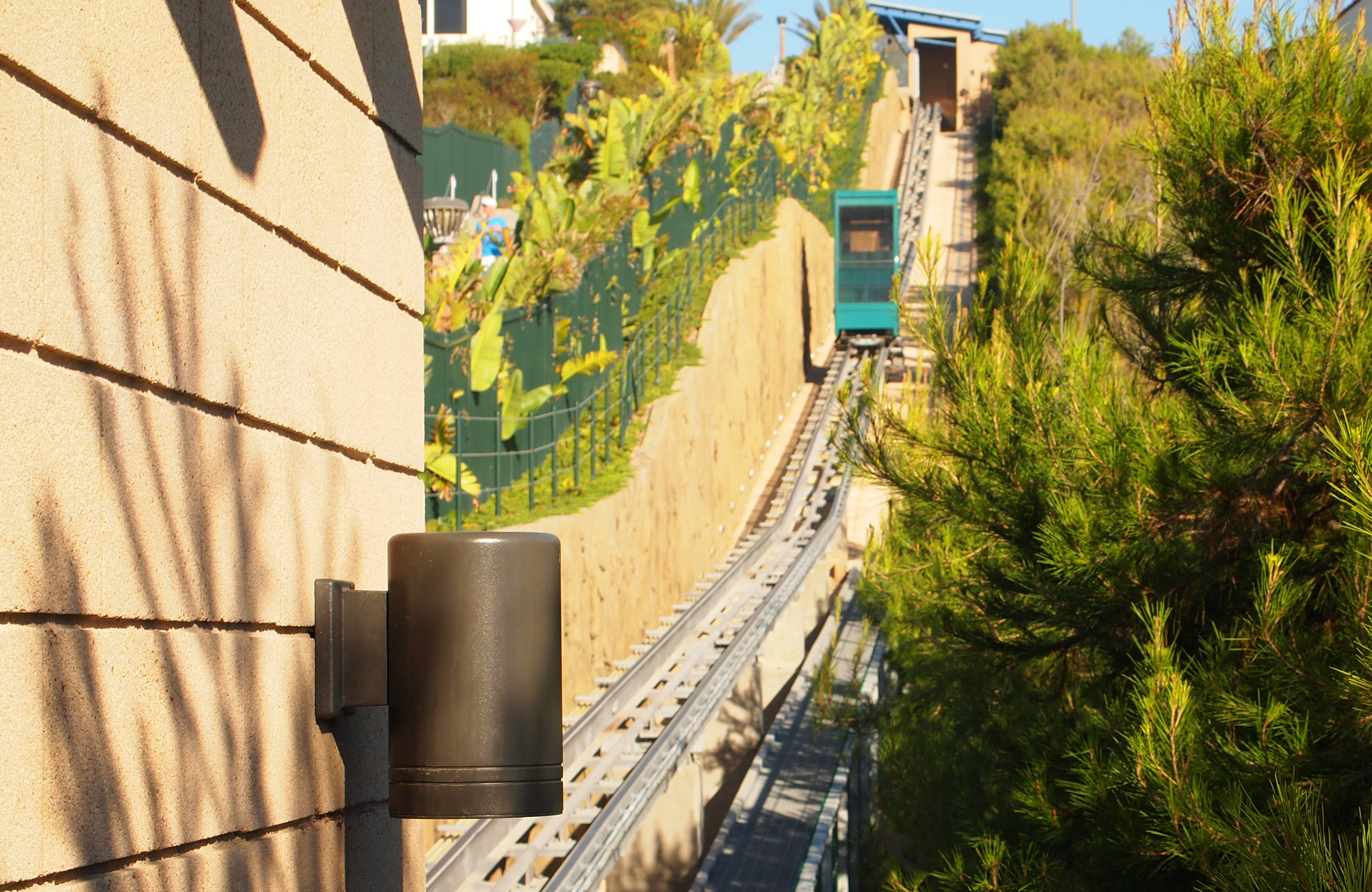
- As seen from the bottom station

General information
- Location: Strand Beach, Dana Point, California
- Coordinates: 33°28′9″N 117°42′59″W

History
- Opened: 2009
Location

Strand Beach Elevator is an inclined elevator in Dana Point, California that transports people between a beach area and a hilltop, making the beach accessible. A developer agreed to construct this amenity for the city as part of an overall deal for a large real estate development. It was completed and opened in 2009, and ownership and operation was turned over to the city.

== See also ==
- Angels Flight, funicular in downtown Los Angeles
- List of inclined elevators
