= Clifton Incline =

Clifton Incline may refer to:

- Clifton Incline (Niagara Falls)
- Clifton Incline (Pittsburgh)

== See also ==
- Clifton (disambiguation)
