= Lugano degli Angioli funicular =

Closed funicular in Lugano, Switzerland

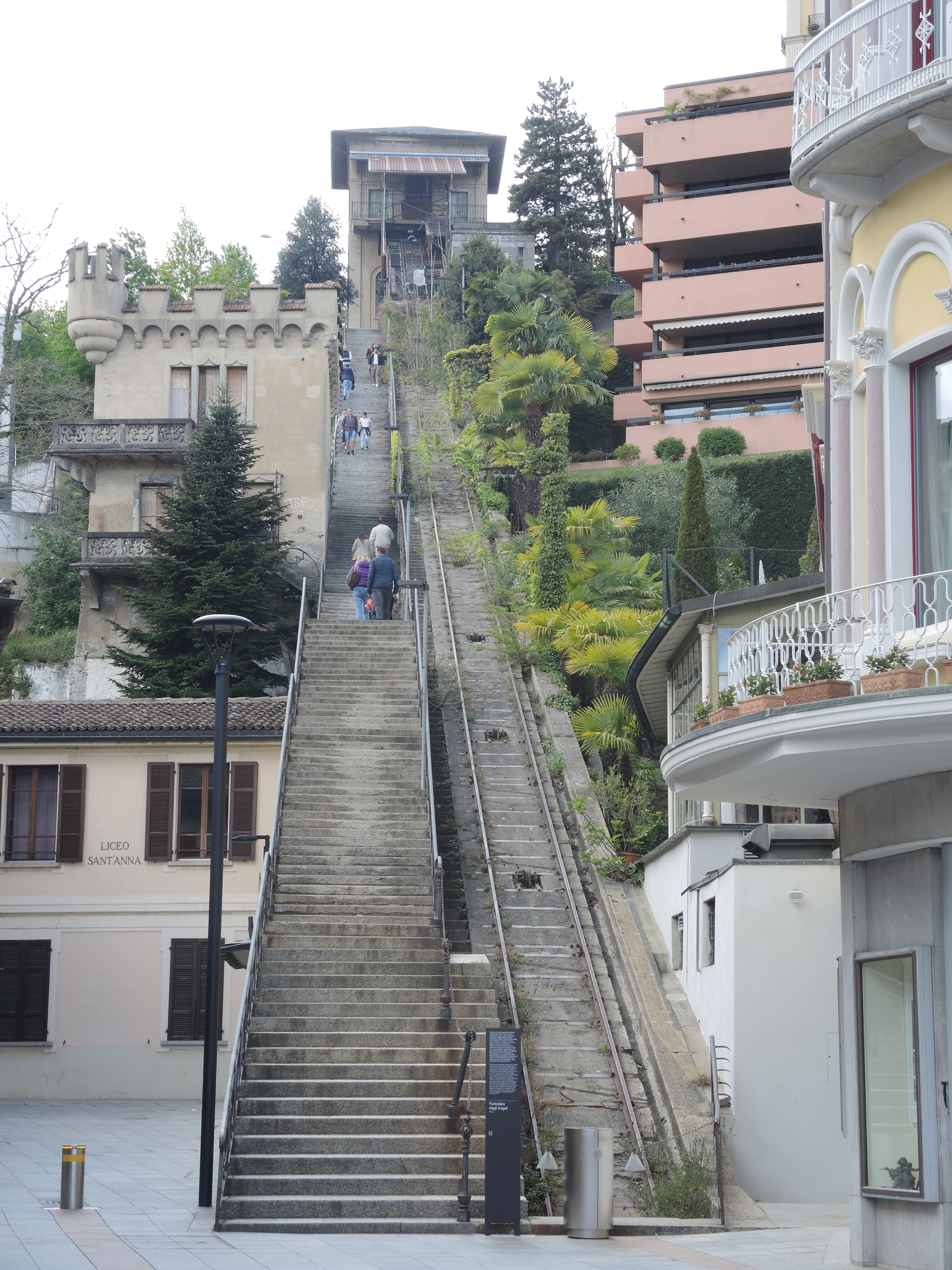
- The Salita degli Angioli (left) and disused funicular (right), seen from the lakeside in 2023

Overview
- Status: Ceased operation
- Owner: City of Lugano (from 1973)
- Locale: Lugano, Ticino, Switzerland
- Coordinates: 46.000149°N 8.948221°E
- Termini: Santa Maria degli Angioli; Hotel Bristol
- Stations: 2

Service
- Type: funicular (inclined lift)
- Rolling stock: 1 for 26 passengers

History
- Opened: 24 July 1913
- Closed: 4 October 1986; 38 years ago

Technical
- Line length: 142 metres (466 ft)
- Number of tracks: 1
- Track gauge: 1,000 mm (3 ft 3 3/8 in)
- Electrification: from opening
- Maximum incline: 44%

The Lugano degli Angioli funicular (Italian: Funicolare Lugano degli Angioli) was a funicular railway and inclined lift in the city of Lugano in the Swiss canton of Ticino. It linked a lower terminus near the lakeside and the church of Santa Maria degli Angioli with an upper terminus adjacent to the Hotel Bristol on the Via Clemente Maraini. The line remains in existence, although in an abandoned state and with no car. For most of its length, it is paralleled by the steps of the Salita degli Angioli.

The upper terminus of the funicular was on the third floor of a tower, linked with a footbridge to the hotel, whilst the lower terminus was a simple stop alongside the Salita degli Angioli. The line had a single track and single car, which was balanced by a vertically operating counterweight in the tower. It was of 1,000 mm (3 ft 3 3/8 in) gauge, was 142 metres (466 ft) in length and climbed a vertical distance of 53 metres (174 ft), with a maximum gradient of 44% and an average gradient of 38.7%. The car had 4 compartments and could carry 26 passengers.

The line was built by the Stigler elevator company of Milan and opened in 1913. In 1973 it was gifted by its owner to the City of Lugano. The Hotel Bristol closed in 1981, and the funicular followed in 1986. In 2012 the car was removed, and the line was listed as a cultural property of regional significance.

In April 2018 the Lugano city authorities announced a competition, with a CHF36,000 prize, for the best idea for a future for the funicular. In September of the same year, the same authorities requested a loan of CHF325,000 for a study into the future of the funicular and how it could form part of a wider plan for improved access to the lake. It is estimated that restoration as a static monument would cost CHF2.6 million, and a return to operation would cost CHF5.5 million.

The Angioli funicular was once one of four funiculars within the Lugano area. The other three are still in use, and are the Città–Stazione funicular, the Monte Brè funicular, and the Monte San Salvatore funicular.

== Gallery ==
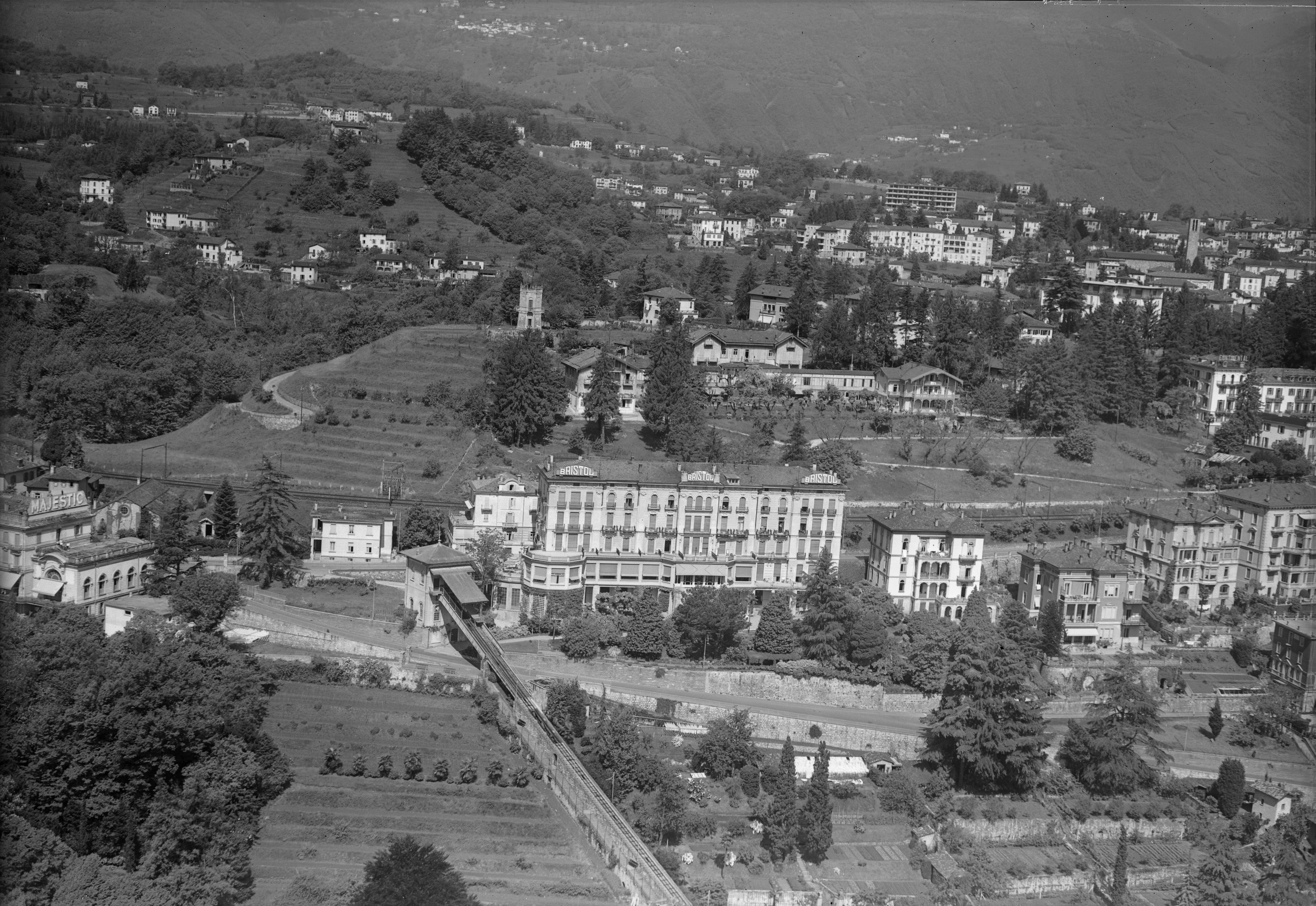
Funicular and hotel from the air in 1950

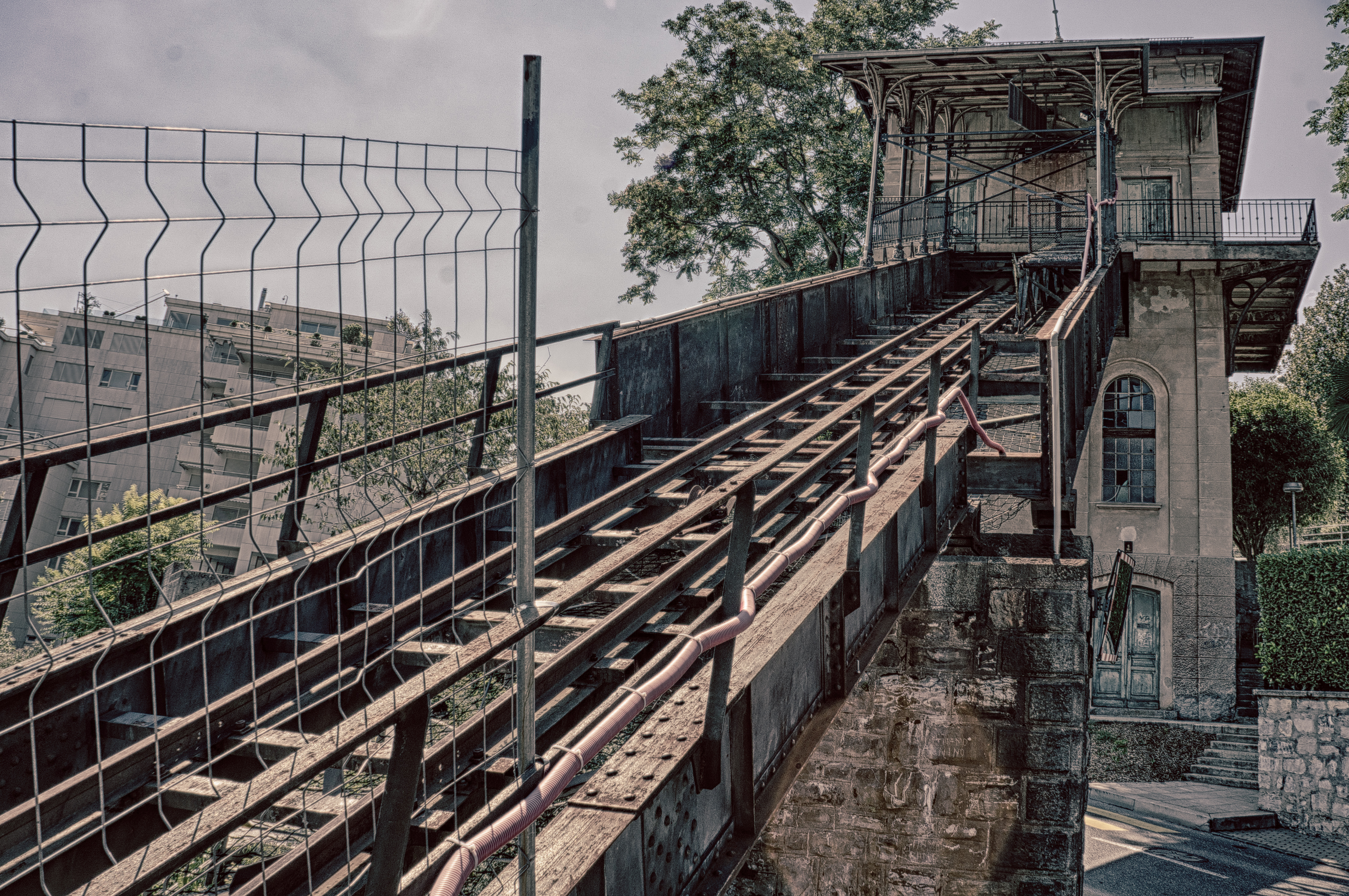
The upper station from below in 2013

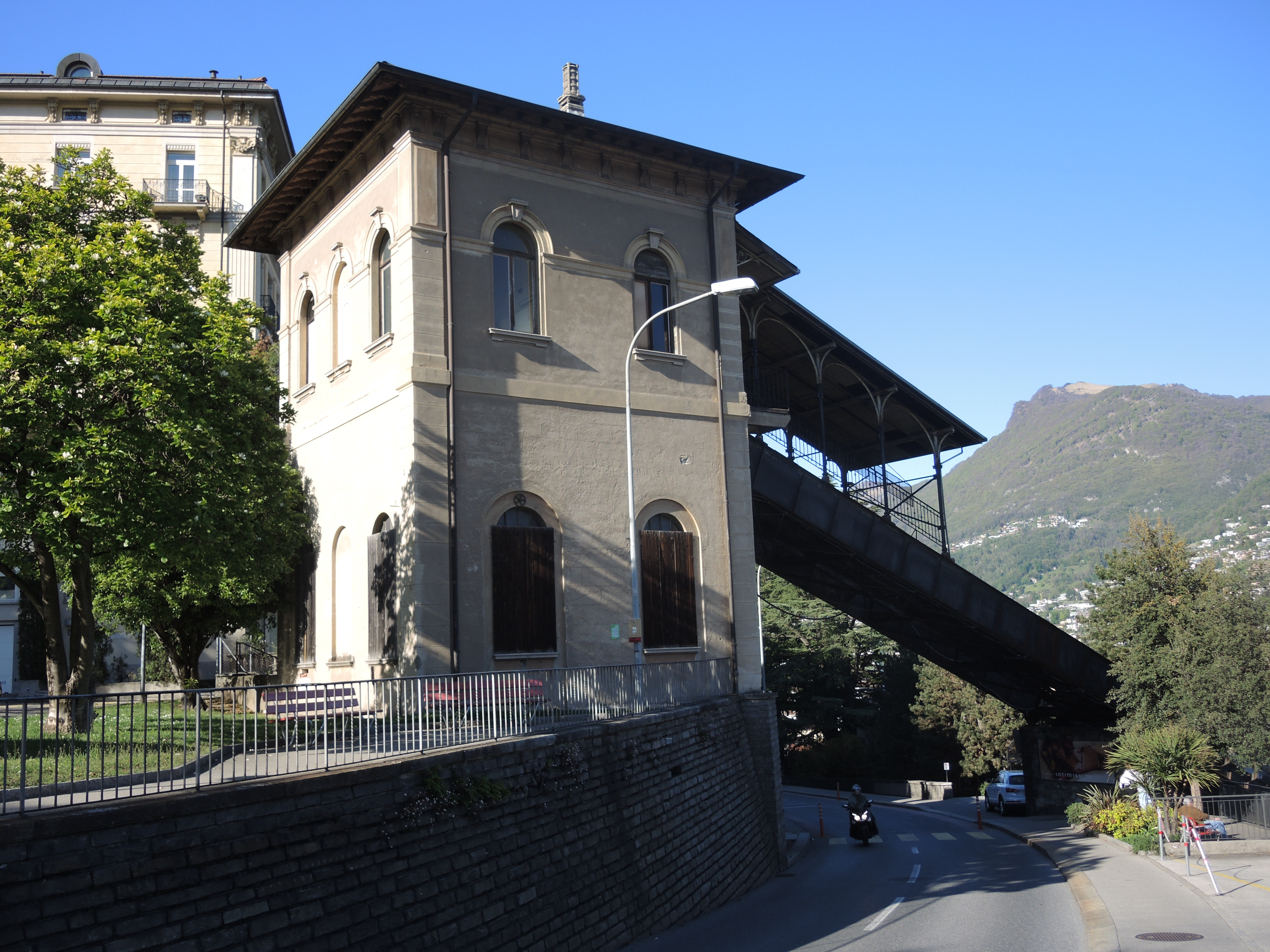
The upper station from the street in 2023

== See also ==
- List of funicular railways
- List of funiculars in Switzerland
