= Ridgewood Incline =

Railroad in Allegheny City, Pennsylvania, US

Overview
- Locale: Allegheny, Pennsylvania
- Coordinates: 40.4619°N 80.0173°W

Service
- Operator(s): Ridgewood Incline Railway Company

History
- Opened: 16 December 1886
- Closed: 30 May 1887

Technical
- Line length: 278 feet (85 m)
- Number of tracks: 1

The Ridgewood Incline was an inclined plane railroad in Allegheny City, Pennsylvania, in what is now the Perry South neighborhood of Pittsburgh. Built in 1886 and burned the next year, it was Allegheny's first and shortest-lived incline.

== Description ==
From its upper station at the corner of Ridgewood and Yale streets, the incline descended at an angle of 32° 31' for a distance of 278 feet (85 m), crossing over Irwin Avenue by an iron girder bridge and terminating at Taggart Street (now North Charles Street), where passengers could access the Pleasant Valley Railway streetcar line. The incline had a single track, with one car called to either end as wanted by an electric bell signal. Unlike most Pittsburgh-area inclines, it lacked a counterbalancing car and was thus not a funicular.

== History ==
In the summer of 1886, a group of investors headed by real-estate broker Alexander Leggate formed the Ridgewood Incline Railway Company for the purpose of building and operating an "elevator incline railway". The work was carried out from the designs and under the superintendence of a local civil engineer named J. Ford Mackenzie. The railway opened to the public on 16 December 1886.

A fire on 30 May 1887, possibly from a natural gas leak, destroyed the engine house and office along with some 30 or 40 feet of track. The incline is not known to have been rebuilt. It appears on an 1890 map with the label "Old Incline Plane (Burned)", hundreds of feet south of the newer Clifton Incline.

== See also ==
- List of inclines in Pittsburgh
