= Kakola Funicular =

Inclined lift in Turku, Finland

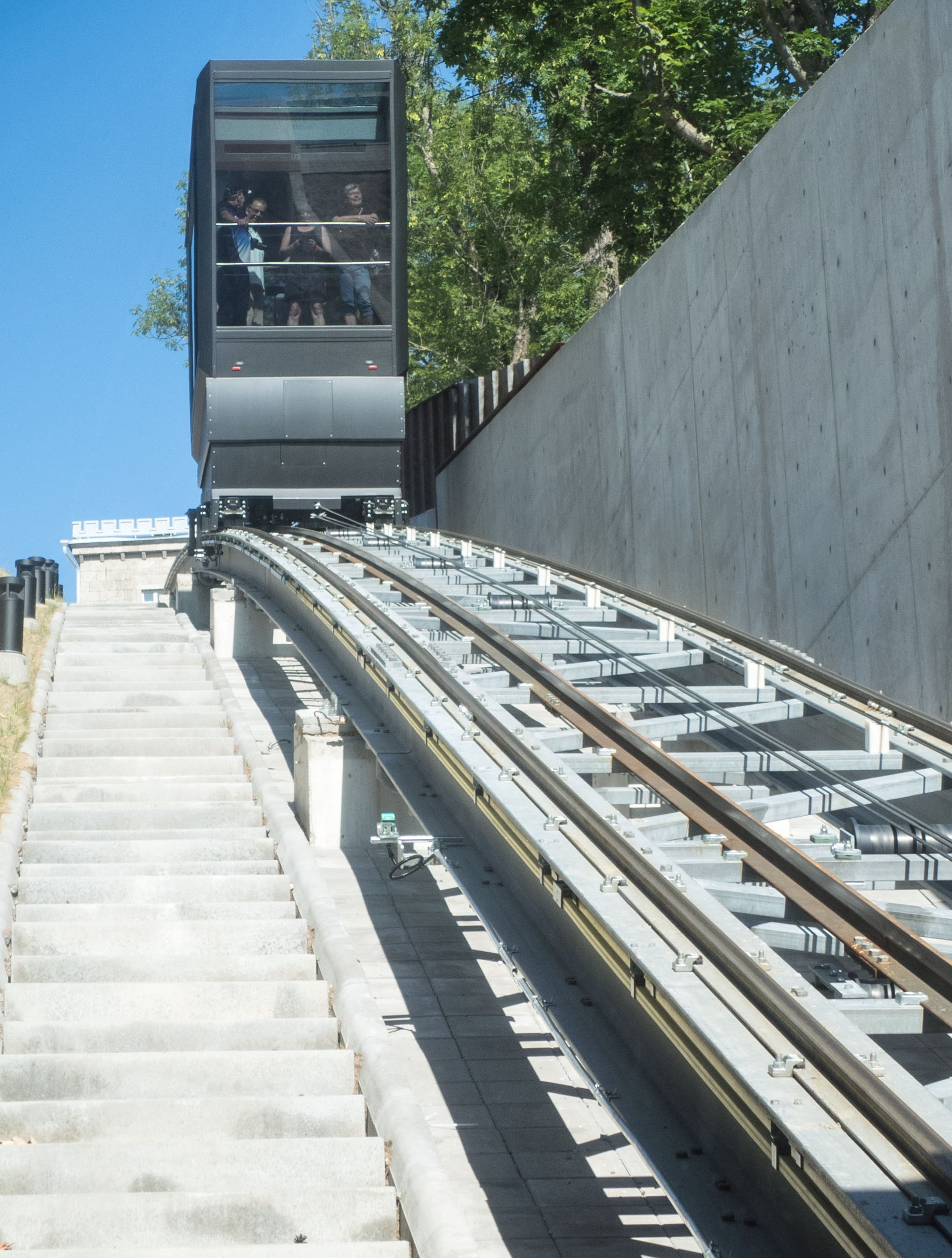
- Kakola funicular arriving at Linnankatu

Overview
- Owner: The City of Turku
- Locale: Turku, Finland
- Coordinates: 60°26′28.64″N 22°14′42.29″E
- Termini: Linnankatu 55b (lower station); Graniittilinnankatu 3 (upper station)
- Stations: 2

Service
- Type: Inclined lift

History
- Planned opening: 2018
- Opened: 24 May 2019

Technical
- Track length: 0.130 km (0.081 mi)
- Operating speed: 7 km/h (4.3 mph)

The Kakola Funicular (Finnish: Kakolan funikulaari; Swedish: Kakolafunikularen) is an inclined lift in Turku, Finland. The lift has been in operation since 2019. Despite its name, the Kakola funicular is not a true funicular, as it does not have a human operator nor a second carriage as a counterweight. It is the first outdoor inclined lift in Finland.

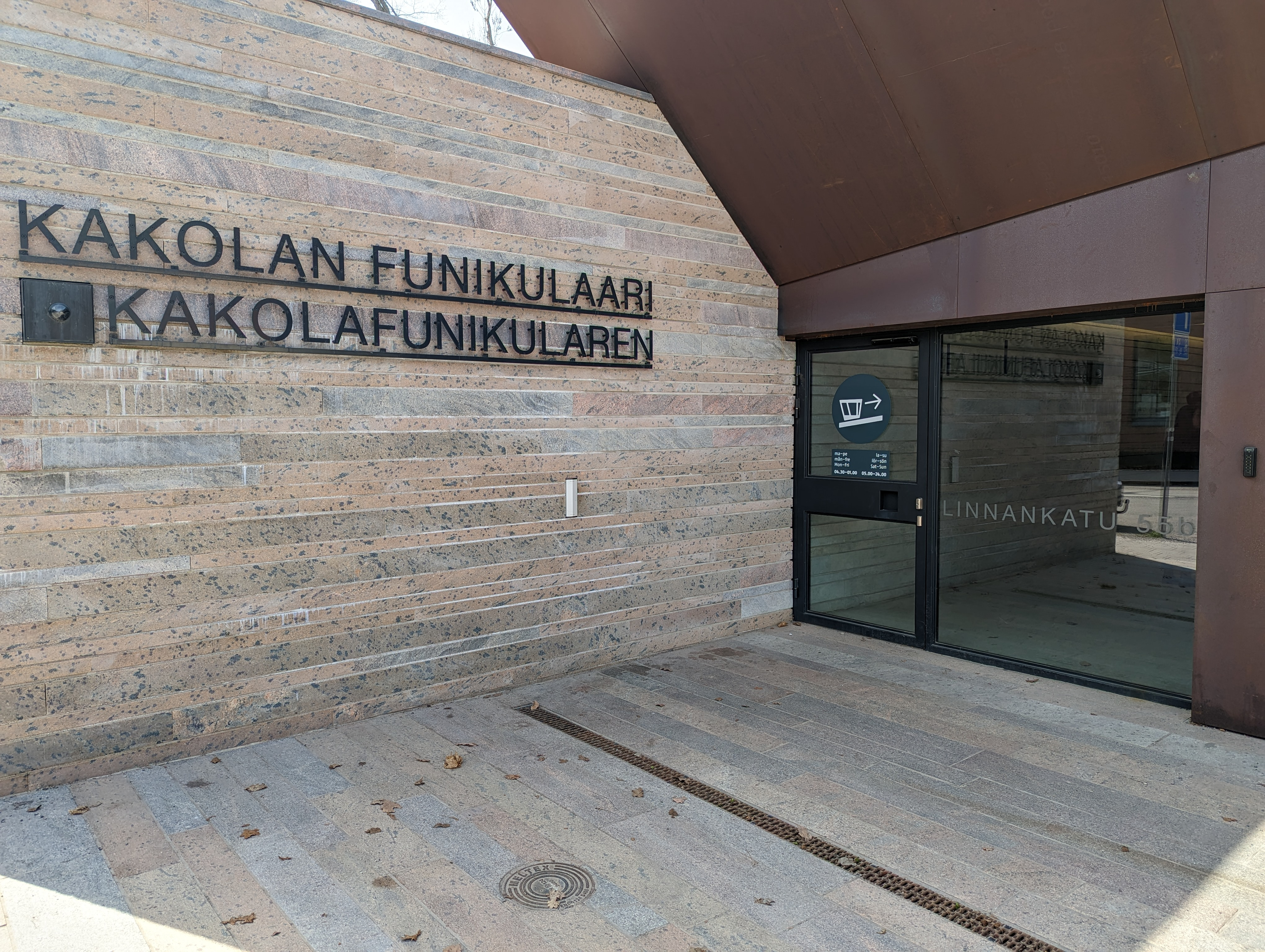
The lower station

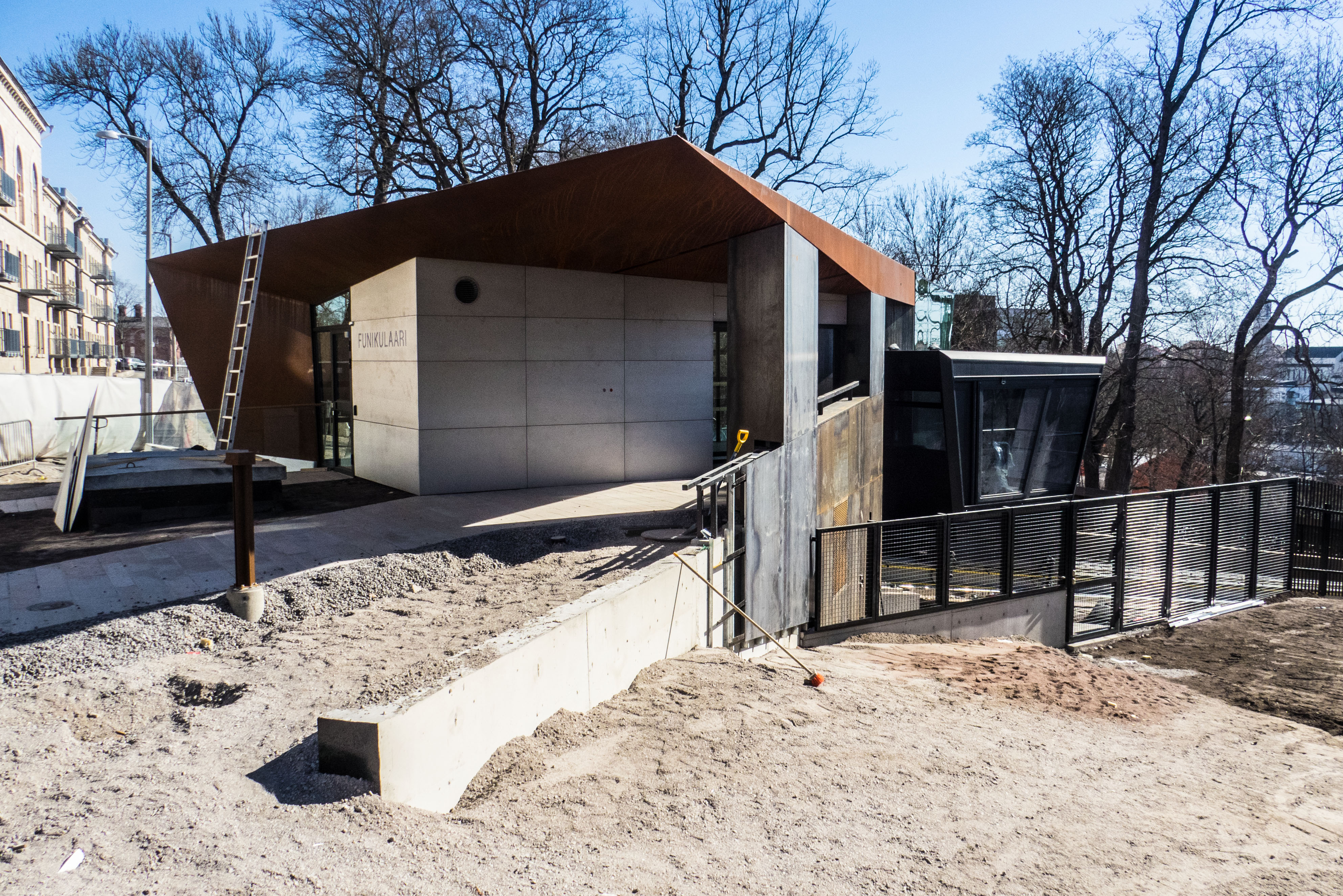
The upper station

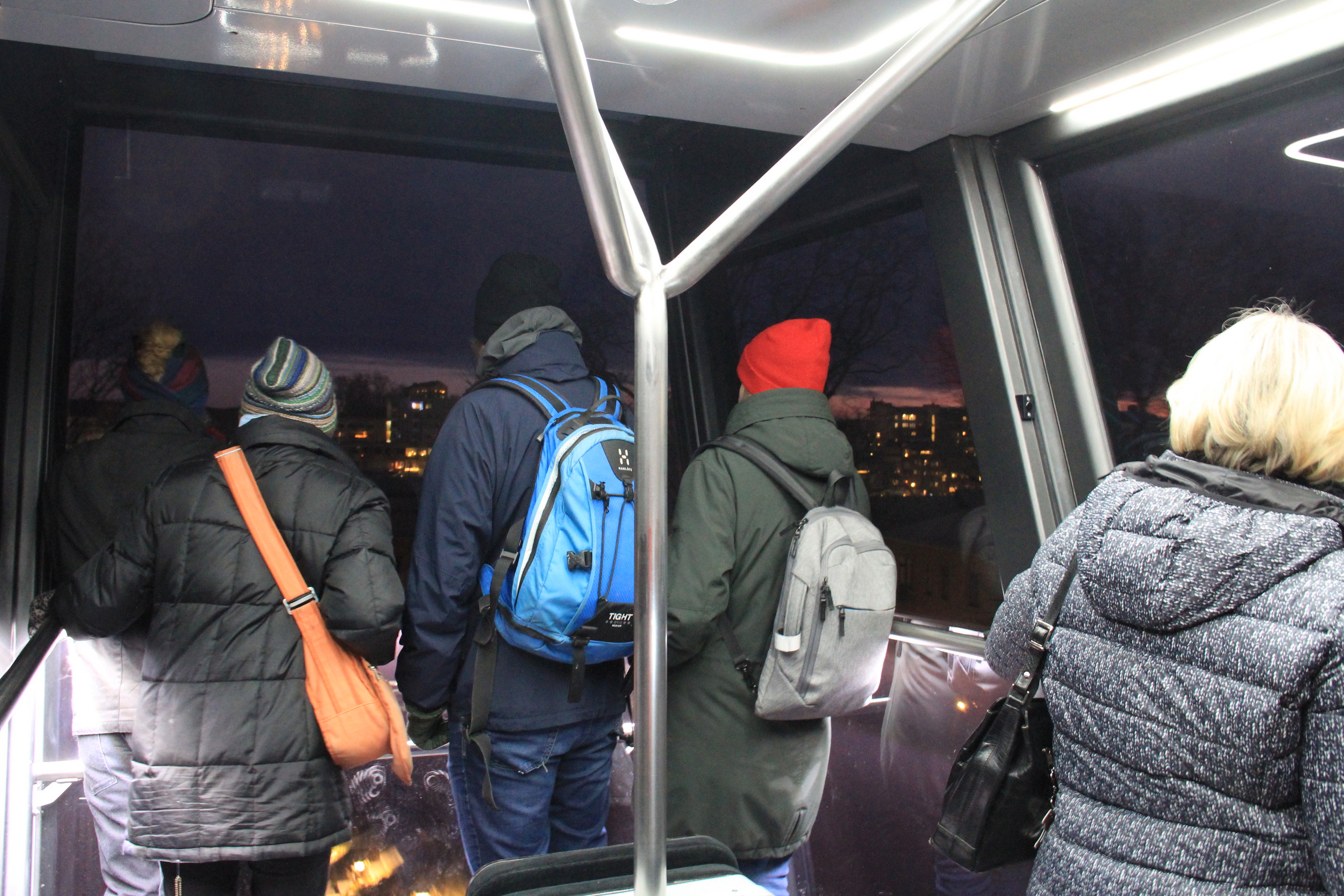
Interior of the carriage

== Technical problems ==
The funicular has suffered from numerous technical difficulties throughout its lifetime, with downtimes extending sometimes to weeks. On average it has suffered a problem of some sort every six days, and been halted a total of 130 times during the first two years of its operation. Because of its excessive downtimes and technical problems, the funicular has gained the nickname "jumikulaari", a portmanteau of "jumissa" ("stuck") and "funikulaari" ("funicular").
