= 100 Street Funicular =

Inclined elevator in Edmonton, Canada

Coordinates: 53°32′23″N 113°29′22″W

The 100 Street Funicular ascending

The 100 Street Funicular is an inclined elevator in Edmonton, Alberta. It connects 100 Street in Downtown Edmonton with Louise McKinney Riverfront Park, which is part of Edmonton's North Saskatchewan River valley parks system.

== Design ==
The 100 Street Funicular's upper terminus is just south of the Fairmont Hotel Macdonald and descends parallel to a staircase with built-in seating and a bicycle rail. Its Plexiglass-walled cabin has a capacity of 20 people and traverses a distance of 55 meters in 48 seconds. Despite its name, the 100 Street Funicular is not a true funicular in the sense that it only has one car, not two counterbalanced cars. The funicular is free to ride.

At the funicular's lower terminus is a 200 meter promenade and a pedestrian bridge over Grierson Hill Road, terminating in the Frederick G. Todd Overlook over the North Saskatchewan River and the Low Level Bridge. North of the promenade is a grassy slope featuring a public artwork, Turbulent by Jill Anholt, that doubles as seating. A conventional elevator with a capacity of 10 people can take riders to the river valley floor. This entire route is described as the Mechanized River Valley Access project and provides fully mechanized access to lower reaches of Edmonton's river valley, including to disabled users.

The funicular was designed by DIALOG. In 2019, the design was honored by an International Architecture Award from the Chicago Athenaeum and the European Centre for Architecture Art Design and Urban Studies. In 2020, the Royal Architectural Institute of Canada awarded the full Mechanized River Valley Access project a National Urban Design Award in the category of civic design. The design of the broader project was inspired in part by New York's High Line.

== History ==
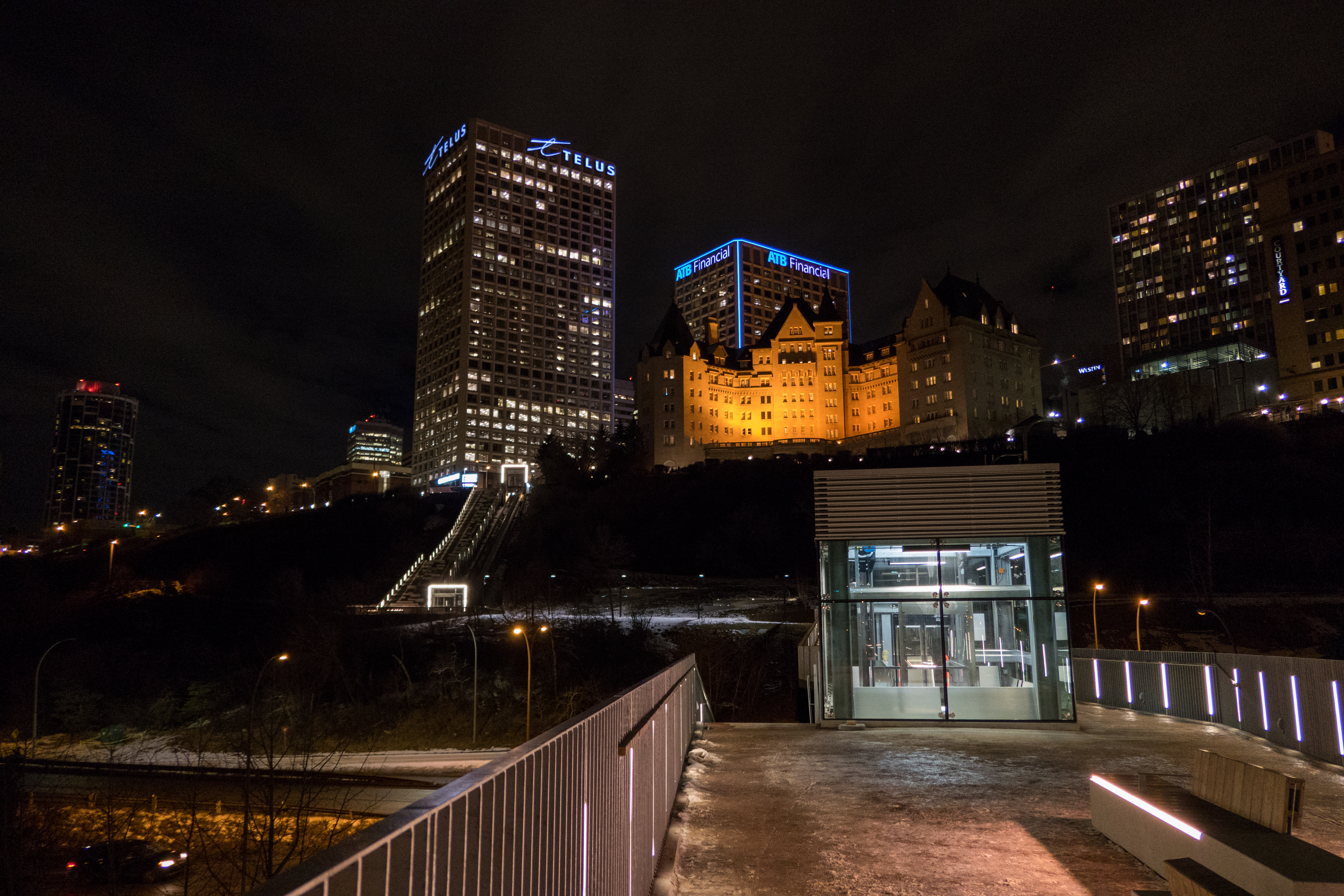
A view of the whole Mechanized River Valley Access system, with the funicular and staircase in the left background.

The first inclined elevator to operate in Edmonton was the Edmonton Incline Railway, which connected an area just below McDougall United Church to the Edmonton Hotel, which was at the bottom of the hill. Unlike the 100 Street Funicular, the elevator cost a fee to ride—five cents per passenger on foot or fifteen cents for a team of horses. It operated from 1907 to 1918, its decline hastened by the completion of the High Level Bridge.

In the early 2010s, the construction of a new inclined elevator was proposed both as a tourist attraction and as an accessibility tool. By 2013, the idea was one of five river valley access projects to attract a funding commitment from the federal government and the River Valley Alliance, an arm's-length organization comprising seven municipalities along the North Saskatchewan River. The idea underwent considerable debate among both residents and city councillors, with some questioning whether it would be a wasteful investment, although a large majority of the funding was committed by the federal and provincial governments. A report noted that the journey into the river valley on the funicular would take longer than using the existing steps, but concluded that it should still be built to strengthen the connections between downtown and the river valley and aid those with mobility issues. Edmonton City Council approved the project in June 2015. Mayor Don Iveson expressed that the stringent deadline and lack of flexibility in using the federal funds pushed the council towards committing to the project.

An environmental assessment was completed in February 2016, and construction began soon after on March 7. The foundation was laid by September 2016, and the Swiss-manufactured cab was set to be delivered by the end of that year. By August 2017, only some electrical work, testing, and landscaping remained to be completed.

The funicular formally opened on December 9, 2017, with a ribbon-cutting ceremony by Don Iveson. It was delivered on time and within budget. Out of the $24 million construction budget, Edmonton contributed $1.7 million, with the rest coming from provincial and federal contributions and the River Valley Alliance. The city also committed to covering nearly all of the operational costs.

== Challenges ==
Shortly after opening, the funicular began to be beset by a number of problems. Some of them were caused by Edmonton's cold climate; during the first winter of operation, blowing snow in the door tracks triggered alarms multiple times, and it was found that the doors would malfunction under temperatures below −25 °C. In late 2018, three panes of custom-made glass were shattered in an act of vandalism. The repairs necessitated a shutdown of two days and cost $47,000. In addition, the emergency stop button was pushed by accident more than 300 times during the first year of operation. Nevertheless, the city found that the maintenance and operating costs in the first year, which were about $716,000, were within the expected range. Improvements were made during a three-week period in December 2018 to reduce the number of incidents requiring maintenance, including by adding a cover to the emergency stop button and improving performance under winter conditions. In June 2020, several of the glass panels were once again smashed by a vandal, who was apprehended.

There have also been occasional problems and complaints concerning the broader Mechanized River Valley Access project. The second elevator descending from the Frederick G. Todd Overlook, which opened in February 2018, was shut down two days after opening by a group of young men jumping up and down. Initially, cyclists also complained that when they had to take the stairs outside of the 7 AM to 9 PM operating hours of the funicular, the bicycle rail was too narrow and awkward to comfortably use. These issues were addressed in later repairs.

Taking stock of the funicular's challenges five years after opening, Edmonton Journal opinion writer Keith Gerein argued that although there were understandable reasons for approving it, the funicular had turned out to be "one of Edmonton’s weirdest and most superfluous installations." He claimed that the challenges with vandalism, graffiti, and minor disruptions validated the concerns of the project's critics that Edmonton would be left shouldering a large maintenance bill, and questioned whether the ridership—averaging to 300 passengers per day—was worth it.
