= Tunnel lift of Trümmelbach Falls =

Underground funicular in the Bernese Oberland, Switzerland

Overview
- Other name(s): Trümmelbachfälle Tunnel-lift
- Status: In operation
- Locale: Lauterbrunnen, Canton of Bern, Switzerland
- Stations: 2
- Website: truemmelbachfaelle.ch

Service
- Type: Funicular (inclined elevator)
- Operator(s): Familie Kaspar von Almen AG
- Rolling stock: 1 for 40 passengers

History
- Opened: 24 May 1913 (112 years ago)
- Enhancement: 1964
- Enhancement: 1983

Technical
- Line length: 98 m (322 ft)
- Number of tracks: 1
- Electrification: from opening
- Highest elevation: 890 m (2,920 ft)
- Maximum incline: 104%

The Tunnel lift of Trümmelbach Falls is an inclined elevator or funicular in Bernese Oberland, Switzerland. The installation leads visitors of Trümmelbach Falls from the entrance at 819 m to the upper part of the underground waterfalls at 890 m. It runs 98 m in a tunnel, originally at an incline of 104% and a difference of elevation of 71 m. The single cabin functions with a counterweight. The first lift was opened in 1913. The installation had been replaced in 1964 by Habegger Thun. The current lift was built by Garaventa in 1982/1983.
