= El Remate =

Village in Petén, Guatemala

Coordinates: 17°00′N 89°42′W

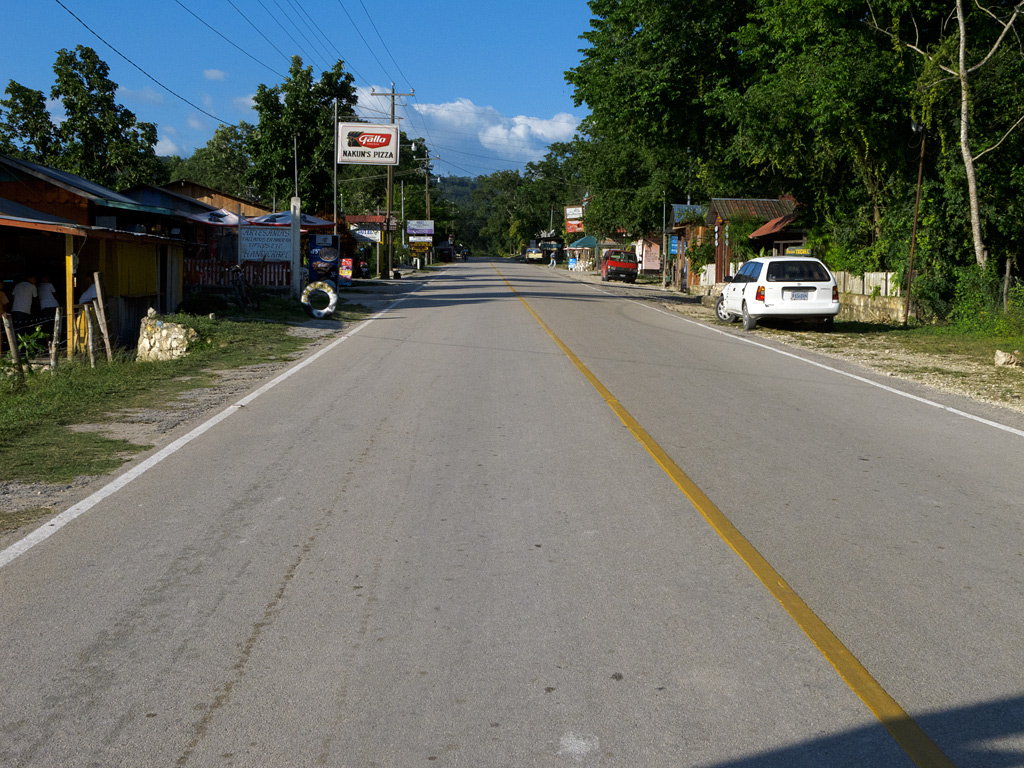
The busiest section of El Remate, where Ruta 3 passes the lake.

El Remate is a rural village located on the eastern tip of Lake Petén Itzá in Petén, Guatemala, Central America. It has a population of approximately 2,000 and a tropical savanna climate.

El Remate means "the end" in Spanish, and likely refers to the pointed eastern end of the lake, which is 32 km. (20 miles) long and 5 km (3 miles) wide.

The village is located on Ruta 3, the sole road from the town of Flores to the major Maya archaeological site of Tikal and is a popular stop for tourists. A much less visited local Maya ruin site is Ixlu. Businesses in El Remate include small eco-friendly hotels, small workshops that sell handmade wood carvings, and boat trips on the lake. The Biotopo Protegido Cerro Cahuí is a protected nature preserve that offers birdwatching opportunities, monkey sightings, lookouts over the lake, and nature walks.

Two kilometers south of El Remate village is El Cruce, the intersection where the Ruta 3 road meets CA13, the other major road in northern Guatemala. CA13 connects El Remate to Melchor de Mencos on the border of Belize.

== See also ==
- List of Maya sites
