= Standseilbahn Hotel Montana =

Funicular in Lucerne, Switzerland

Overview
- Status: In operation
- Locale: Lucerne, Switzerland
- Termini: Haldenstrasse / Gesegnetmattstrasse; "Hotel Montana" at Adligenswilerstrasse
- Stations: 6 (since 1988), 2 (before?)

Service
- Type: Funicular
- Operator(s): Hotel Montana
- Rolling stock: 1 for 15 passengers

History
- Opened: 1910
- New installation: 1987

Technical
- Line length: 85 m (279 ft)
- Number of tracks: 1
- Track gauge: 1,000 mm (3 ft 3 3/8 in)
- Electrification: from opening

Standseilbahn Hotel Montana is a funicular in Lucerne, Switzerland. It leads from Haldenstrasse at the shore of Lake Lucerne to the entrance of Hotel Montana at Adligenswilerstrasse. The installation has a single-car and a counterweight. It runs for a length of 85 m and a difference of elevation of 38 m. The average incline is 50%. Intermediate stops provide access to the premises of SHL Schweizerische Hotelfachschule Luzern.

First built in 1910 as an inclined elevator for hotel guests, a concession was sought from the Swiss Federal Assembly to open it to the public in 1913. Later it was operated based on a cantonal concession.

The original funicular was replaced in 1987 by Garaventa.

Location of stations:

- Lower: 47.055762°N 8.319933°E
- Upper: 47.056522°N 8.319993°E
