= Clifton Incline (Pittsburgh) =

Funicular in Pennsylvania, United States

Coordinates: 40.46376°N 80.01921°W

The Clifton Incline was a funicular that operated from 1889 to 1905 in what is now the Perry Hilltop neighborhood of Pittsburgh, Pennsylvania. It extended from its base at Sarah Street (now Strauss Street) at the intersection with Myrtle Street (now the closed Metcalf Street) to its top landing at Clifton Park near the end of Clifton Street (now Chautauqua Street).

Businessman William McCreery co-founded the incline to facilitate access to a residential neighborhood developed from his former estate. The Clifton Avenue Incline Plane Company, formed for the purpose of erecting and operating the incline, was chartered on June 25, 1888. Within a year of that date, McCreery offered free incline rides to property auctions on the hill.

There were two cars, only one of which carried passengers, the other one being a dummy car serving as a counterweight. A single operator performed the duties of engineer, conductor, and fireman.

The incline closed after an accident on November 10, 1905, in which the passenger car—empty at the time—broke loose, hurtled down the track, plowed through the waiting room on Sarah Street and smashed into the front steps of a house.

== See also ==
- List of funicular railways
- List of inclines in Pittsburgh

== Maps ==
- 1890 plat map showing the Clifton Incline in northeast corner
- 1901 plat map showing the same
