= Inclined elevator =

Form of a cable railway system for steep gradient, similar to a funicular

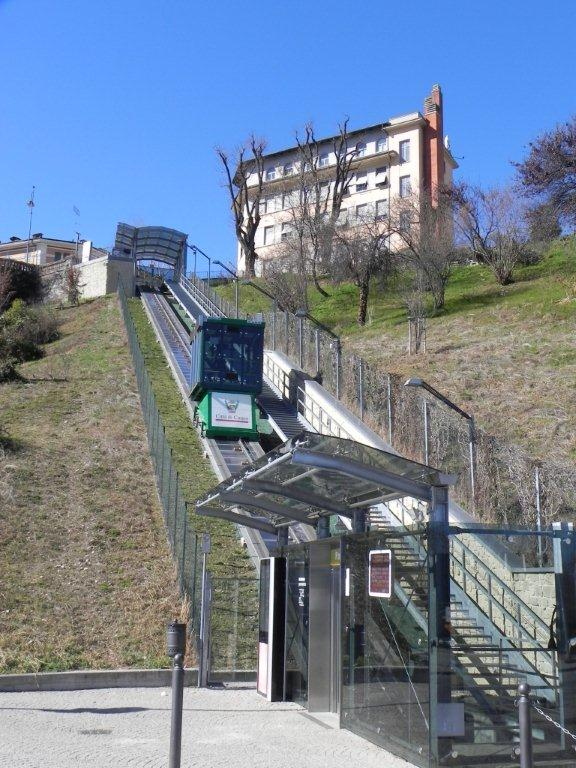
Inclined elevator in Cuneo, Italy

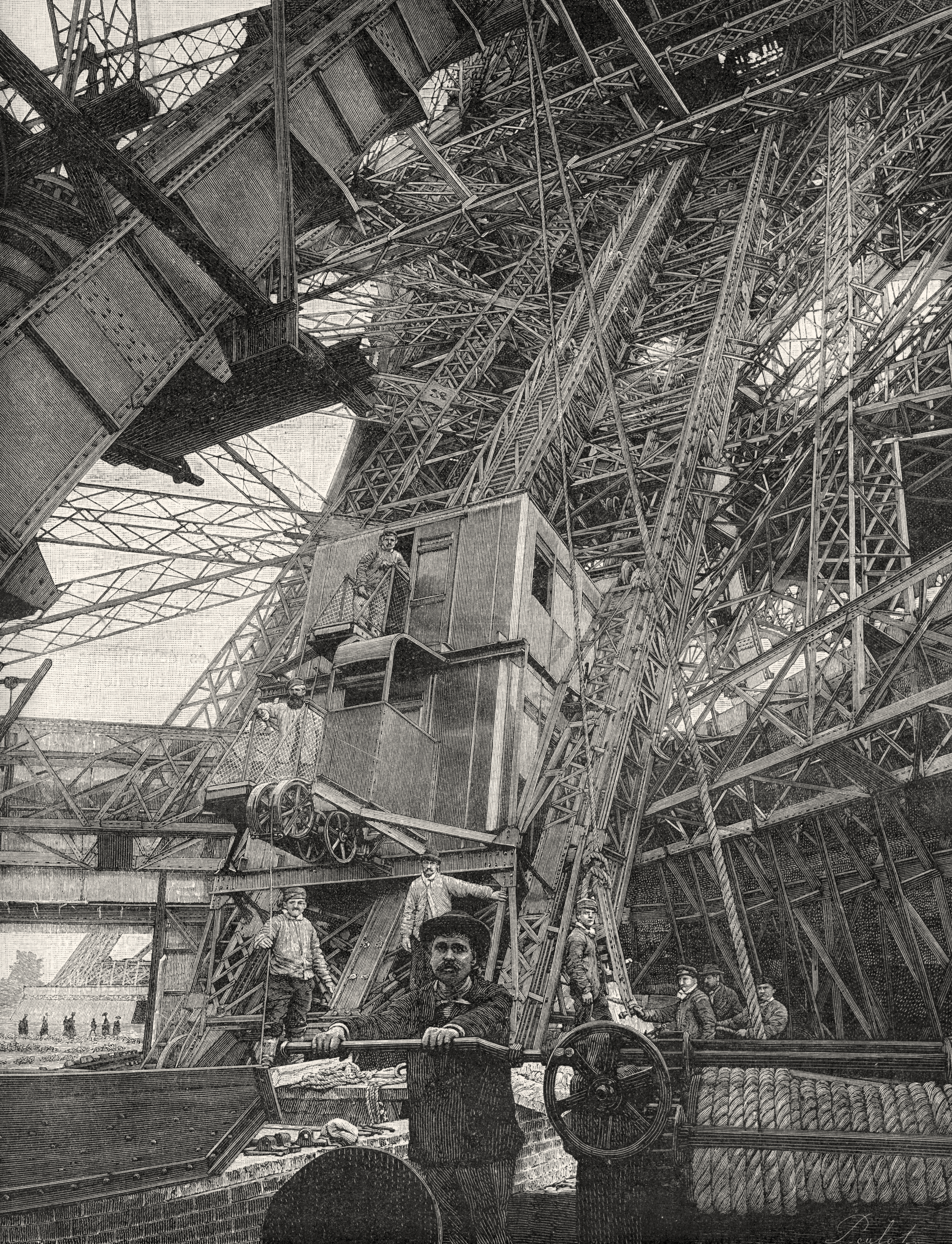
Inclined elevator of the Eiffel Tower, 1890s

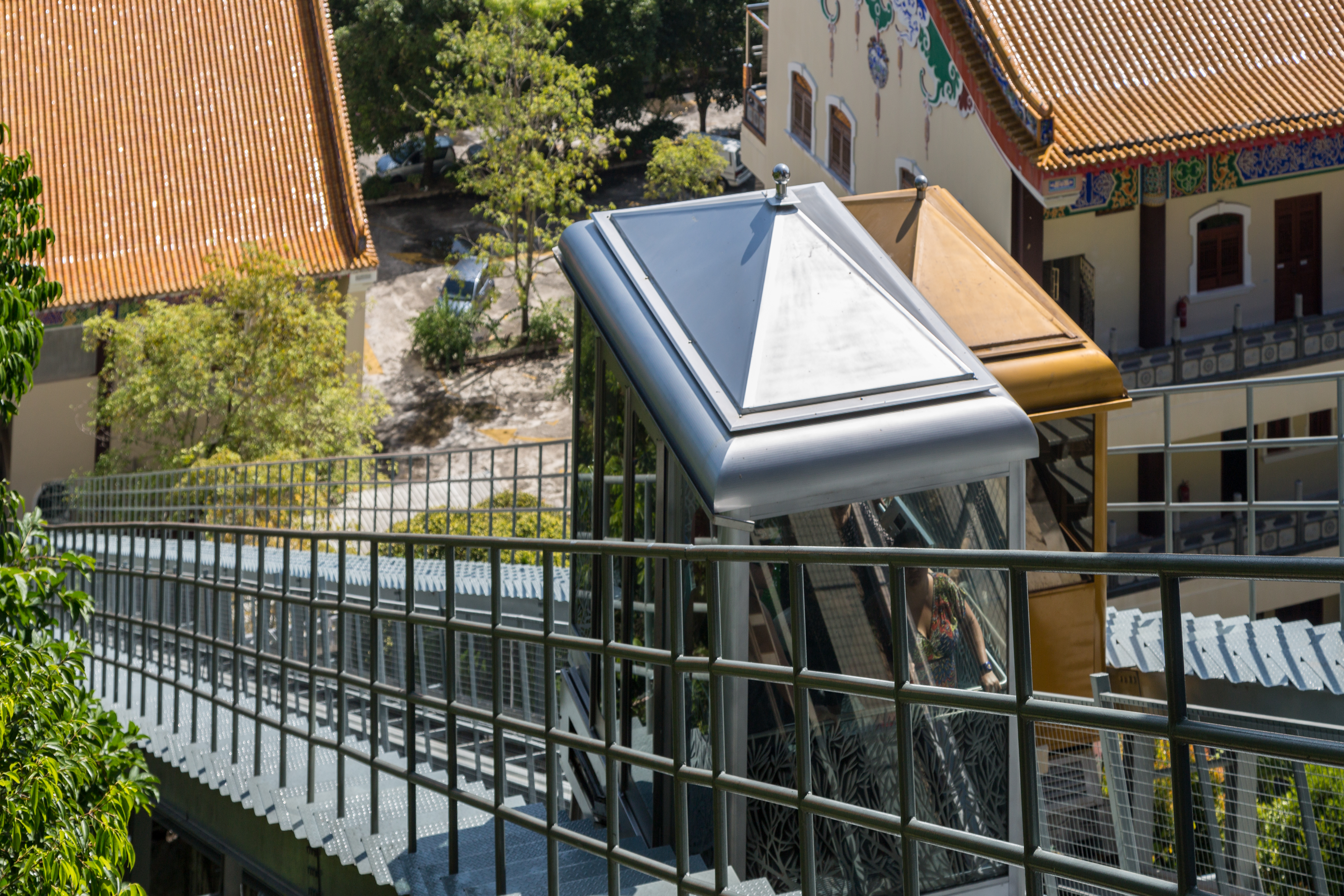
Double-lane inclined elevator in Kek Lok Si temple, Malaysia

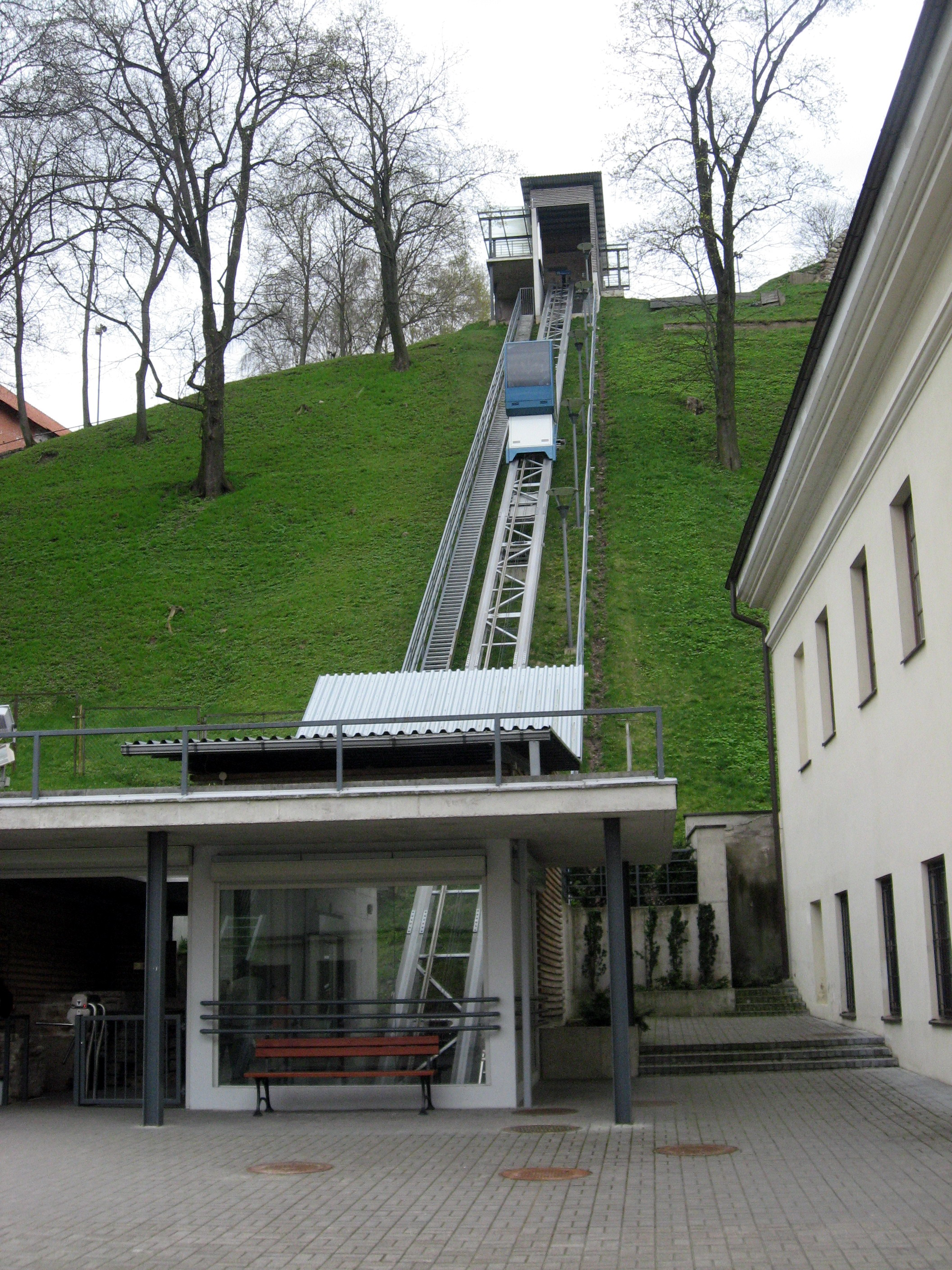
Inclined elevator to the Gediminas Hill in Vilnius, the capital city of Lithuania.

An inclined elevator or inclined lift is a form of elevator that moves along a steep gradient.

== Introduction ==
An inclined elevator consists of one or two inclined tracks on a slope with a single car on each carrying payload. In the case of a two-track configuration each car operates in a shuttle principle: it moves up and down on its own track independently of the other car. A car is either winched up to the station on the top of the incline where the cable is collected on a winch drum. Alternatively a car is balanced by a counterweight moving along the track in the opposite direction, quite similar to an ordinary lift.

Unlike a standard elevator, it can go up tilted grades. It can be used for both residential and commercial purposes. The purpose of inclined elevators is to provide accessibility to steep hillsides and inclines at minimal effort to the user. An inclined elevator is a form of cable railway.

Users with mobility and disability challenges often use an incline platform lift to climb staircases in their home with their mobility scooter or motorized wheelchair. Outdoor inclined elevators are used to access steep hillside property where stairs are not a preferred option for conveying passengers or loads. Inclined elevators can also be used to move equipment and materials to hard to reach elevated locations for industrial or construction purposes.

Within the European Union inclined lifts are subject to EU lift regulations part 22 EN 81-22:2014 which defines some standard limits for their implementations: track inclination is between 15° and 75°; maximum cabin capacity is 100 people (7.500 kg); maximum speed of 4 m/s; the track is straight in the horizontal plane. These limits are not compulsory, though, and if not followed by an installation—for example, the path is curved—some unspecified additional risk analysis is required to be conducted.

== Operation ==
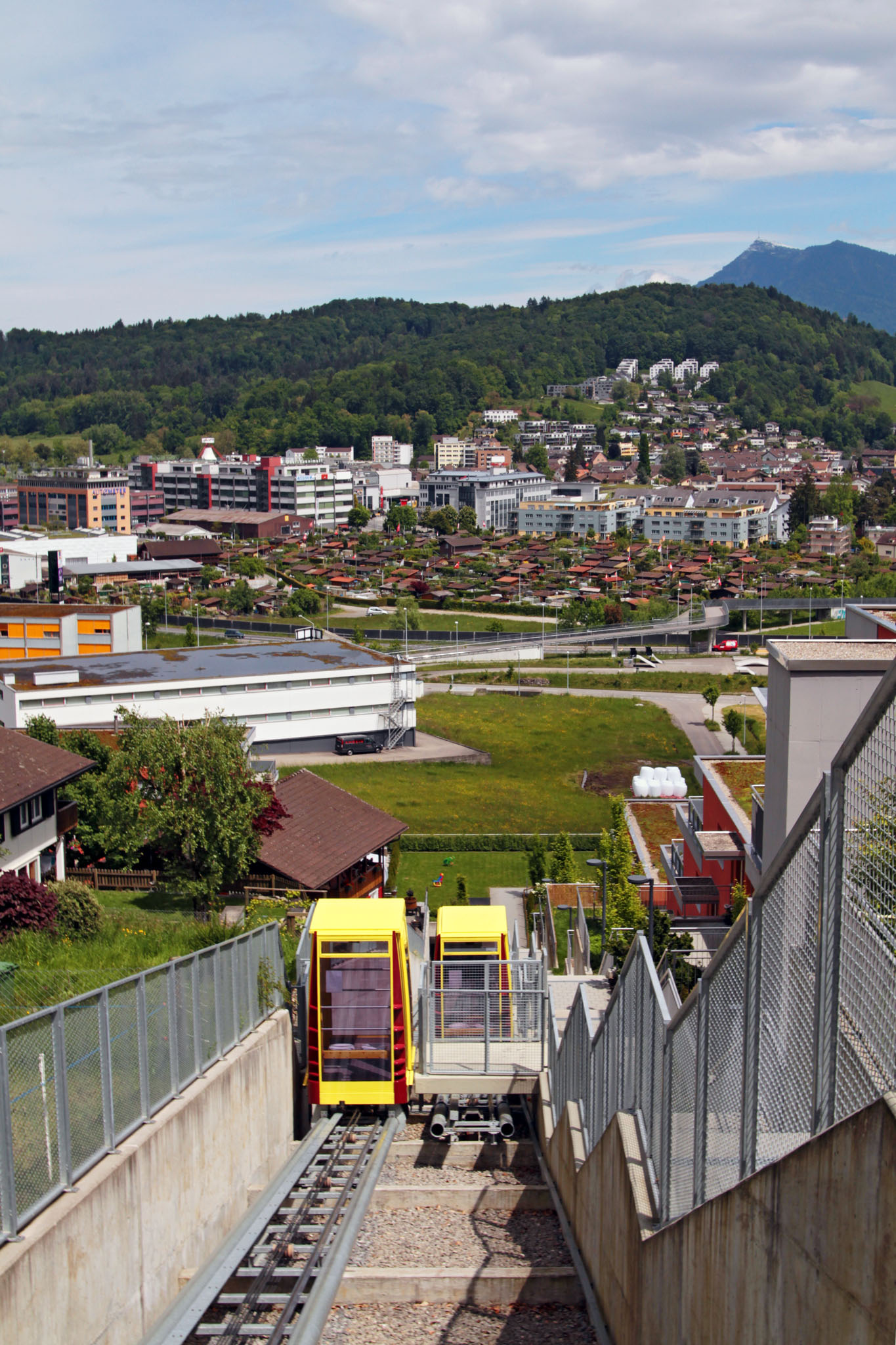
Pair of private lifts at residential complex in Kriens, Switzerland (2013)

Inclined elevator design is based on the same basic technology as conventional, vertical elevator. In general standard elevator equipment can be adapted for systems with an inclines up 10° from vertical, while an incline with more than 20° from vertical will require some additional adaptation.

For example, inclined elevators used in the Stockholm Metro were using standard "vertical" elevator cabins mounted on wheeled platforms adapted to 30° incline. The cabins are balanced by a counterweight and moved by a conventional elevator hoist and cables along the guide rails.

While some inclined elevators are outdoor systems are designed to move people and goods along steep gradients, others are used in buildings for smoother access.

Most common inclined elevators are constructed from steel or aluminum, are powered by electric motors, and operate with push button electronic controls. Common drive systems include cable winding drums and continuous loop traction drives.

Many inclined lifts are constructed along the pressure lines of storage power plants for transporting building materials. Examples are the Gelmerbahn leading to the Gelmersee, and the Funicolare Piora–Ritom leading to Lago Ritom, both in Switzerland.

Modern versions resembling an elevator are used in some installations, such as at the Cityplace Station in Dallas, Texas, the Huntington Metro Station in Huntington, Virginia, the San Diego Convention Center in San Diego, the Luxor Las Vegas hotel on the Las Vegas Strip, and the Eiffel Tower in Paris. The London Millennium Funicular provides an alternative to staircase access to London's Millennium Bridge.

A mixture between an inclined lift and a funicular with two cars was the second Angels Flight in Los Angeles, which ran from 1996 to 2001. The original funicular closed in 1969 and was reinstalled in 1996 using separate cables for each car, which were winched on separate winch drums in the station at the top. The winch drums were connected to the drive motor and the service brake by a gear train. The system failed because of a gear train breakage, causing a fatal accident in 2001. The railway reopened as a true funicular, with a single main haulage cable with one car attached to each end, in 2010. It has closed and reopened several times since, last re-opening on 31 August 2017.

=== Distinction from funicular ===
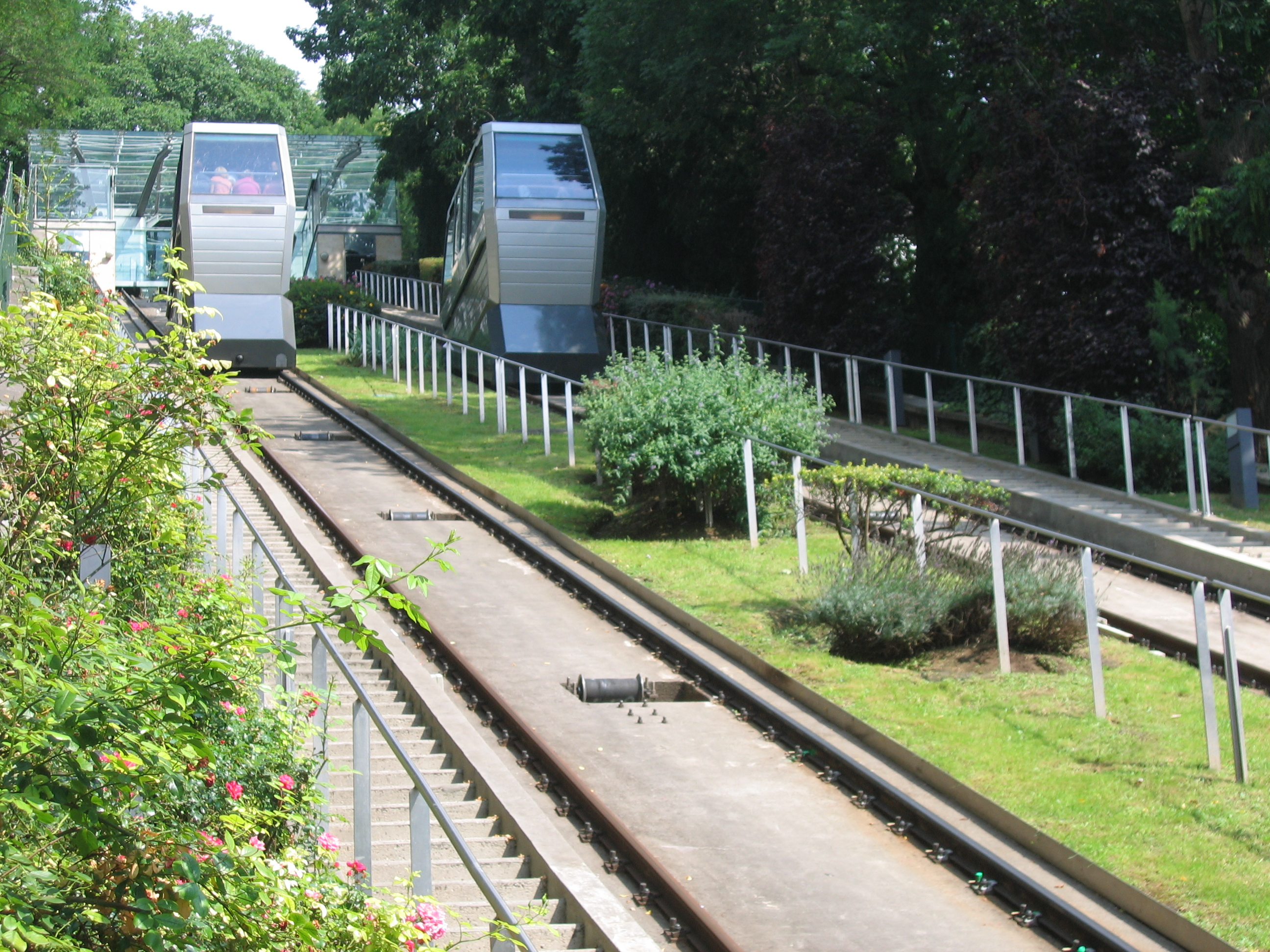
Montmartre Funicular in Paris is a double track inclined elevator.

An inclined elevator differs from a funicular in that the latter has a cable attached to a pair of vehicles, the ascending and descending vehicles counterbalancing each other. In the inclined elevator one car is either winched up to the station at the top of the incline where the cable is collected on a winch drum, or the single car is balanced by a counterweight. Some scholars, though, consider an inclined elevator as a descendant of a funicular. Furthermore, it is not uncommon for historic funicular to be converted into an inclined elevator.

For example, the Montmartre Funicular in Paris was historically a true funicular, but after a reconstruction in 1991 is technically a double-inclined elevator, since each of its two cabins has its own cable traction with its own counterweight and they operate independently from each other, but retain its historical name.

European Union legislation separates inclined elevators and funiculars by putting them in different regulations: inclined lift installations are regulated by EN 81-22:2014 (which regulates elevators) while funicular installations are regulated by EU directive 2000/9/EC (which regulates cableways).

== See also ==
- List of inclined elevators
- Cable car (railway) – Cable-hauled mass transit system
- Canal inclined plane – Cable railway for changing boat elevation
- Elevator – Vertical transport machine
- Funicular – Form of cable railway
- Stairlift – Chair to move people up and down stairs
- Wheelchair lift – Powered device to raise a wheelchair and its occupant over a vertical barrier
- Slope car – Small automated monorail/inclined elevator used in Japan & South Korea
