= Coal Hill Coal Railroad =

Overview
- Dates of operation: about 1861–1871
- Successor: Pittsburgh and Castle Shannon Railroad

Technical
- Track gauge: 3 ft 4 in (1,016 mm)
- Length: 1.5 miles

The Coal Hill Coal Railroad began as a coal mine on the north face of Mt. Washington, then known as "Coal Hill", begun by Jacob Beltzhoover in 1825. This mine was operated by a series of persons, finally by James M. Bailey, who extended the mine completely though the hill to the south side of the hill in 1861. The mine was then sold to the Pittsburgh Coal Company, and rails from the mine were extended an additional one half mile to a new coal mine on the south side of Saw Mill Run. The rails were extended to a third mine, for a total length of one and one half miles. In spite of this short length, the railroad had 3 locomotives and 280 coal cars. The 3 ft 4 in (1,016 mm) narrow gauge railroad delivered coal from these mines to South Pittsburgh via an inclined plane, which ran from the northern end of the mine to Carson Street in Pittsburgh, Pennsylvania. The railroad was sold by the Pittsburgh Coal Company to the Pittsburgh and Castle Shannon Railroad in 1871. After this sale, the mine was enlarged to form the Pittsburgh and Castle Shannon Tunnel, and the train tracks were extended to Castle Shannon, Pennsylvania.
