= Castle Shannon Incline No. 2 =

Cable railway in Pittsburgh, Pennsylvania, US

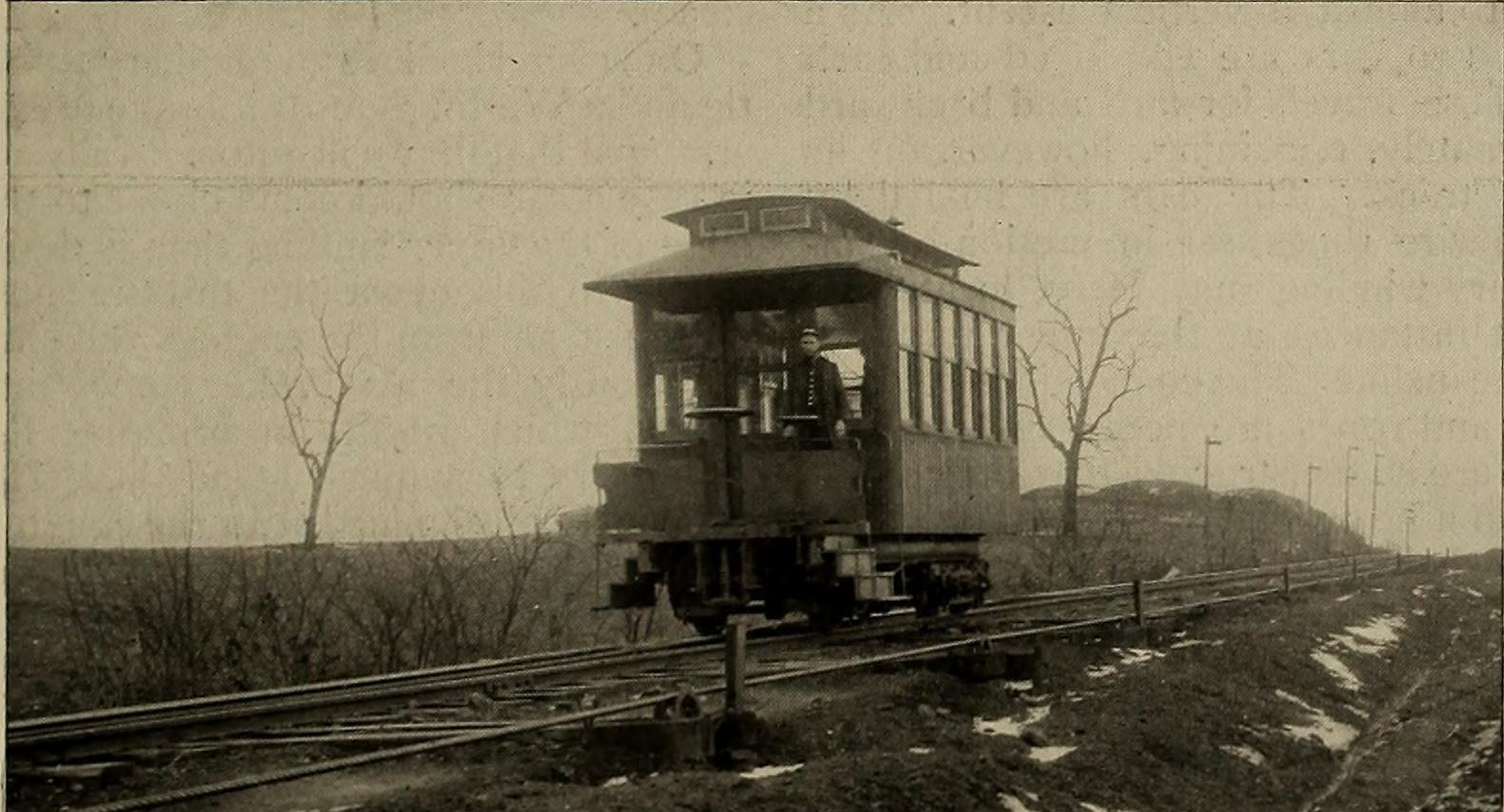
- A car in operation on the incline.

Overview
- Owner: Pittsburgh and Castle Shannon Railroad
- Locale: Mount Washington
- Coordinates: 40.423°N 80.003°W

History
- Opened: August 20, 1892
- Closed: 1914

Technical
- Track length: 2,562 feet (781 m)
- Track gauge: 3 ft 4 in (1,016 mm)

Castle Shannon Incline Number 2 was an inclined cable railway in Pittsburgh, Pennsylvania. It was originally designed by Samuel Diescher, and opened in 1892 as part of the Pittsburgh and Castle Shannon Railroad as a means of transporting passenger traffic over Mt. Washington in concert with the Castle Shannon Incline (called Incline No. 1 while this one was still in service). From the top station at Bailey Street, adjacent to the Castle Shannon Incline top station, No. 2 ran down hill west of Haberman Avenue, ending at Warrington Avenue.

In 1891 Street Railway Journal described No. 2 as "more of the nature of a cable road than an inclined plane" because "an endless cable is used to draw a train of cars." The drop was only 185 feet in 2112 feet, with varying degrees of descent. Before completion of the two Castle Shannon inclines, passenger service was run up the south slope on a route involving a "horseshoe curve" (north of Warrington Avenue and west of Haberman Avenue) and a tunnel that was originally a coal mine, and at the top passengers changed to an older incline to travel down to Carson Street. Coal trains continued to use the old route including the old incline. In the Street Railway Journal account, No. 2 was built to "bring a train of six loaded narrow gauge passenger cars from the railroad to the top of the hill, where passengers may change to the No. 1 incline and descend." The method is not stated, but a grip car was probably used.

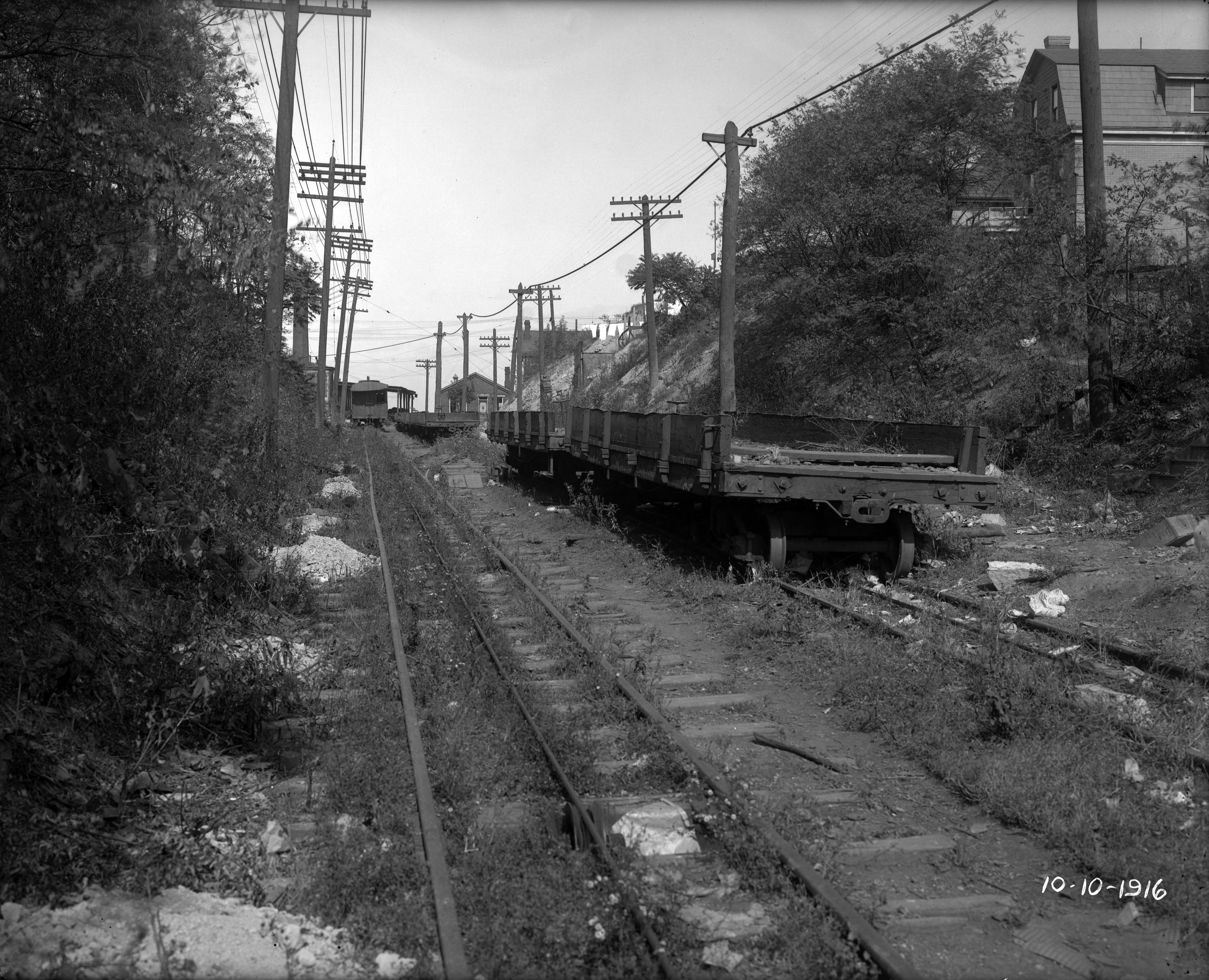
Abandoned Railroad Cars and Tracks on the Castle Shannon Incline No. 2 in 1916, shortly after its closing

Pittsburgh Railways, a trolley system, took over the Castle Shannon passenger service in 1909 and routed their cars through the Mount Washington tunnel that is still in use today. The inclines were no longer part of a through route. Cars continued to run on No. 2 incline for a few years, but it was closed in 1914, with one daily trip being made for franchise purposes until 1919. An undated photograph shows a car with a body like a streetcar on the incline.

== See also ==
- List of inclines in Pittsburgh
