= Castle Shannon Incline =

Funicular in Pittsburgh, Pennsylvania

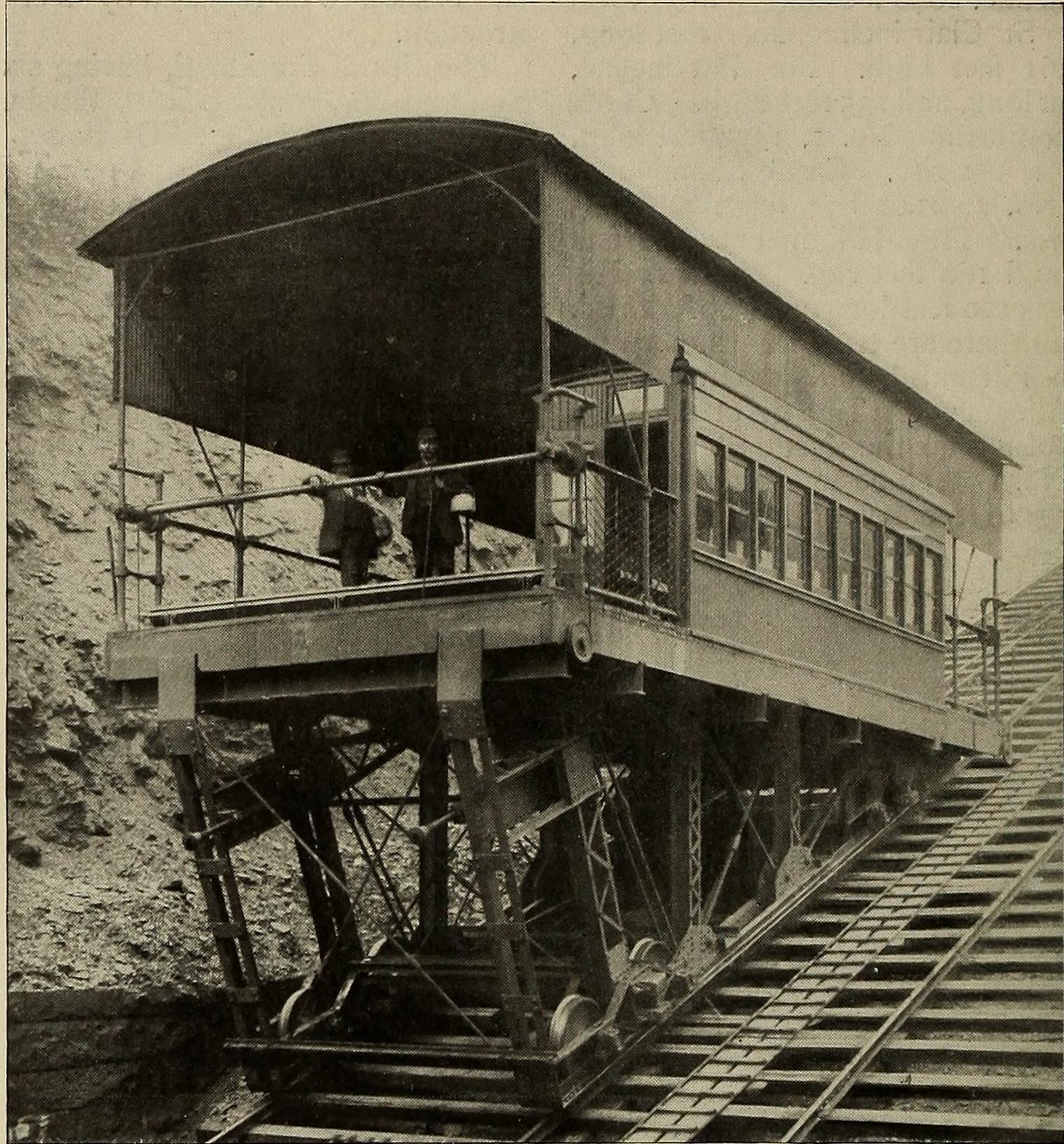
- --Castle Shannon Incline car

Overview
- Owner: Pittsburgh Railways
- Locale: Mount Washington, Pittsburgh (mountain)
- Coordinates: 40.4292°N 80.0026°W

History
- Opened: August 26, 1890
- Closed: June 21, 1964

Technical
- Line length: 1,375 feet (419 m)
- Track gauge: 10 ft (3,048 mm)

The Castle Shannon Incline was a funicular railroad in Pittsburgh, Pennsylvania that was part of the Pittsburgh and Castle Shannon Railroad. It ran down the southern slope of Mount Washington, as part of the route to the suburb of Castle Shannon, 6 miles south of the incline's location. It replaced an earlier incline dating to 1825 that brought coal down from a mine in Mount Washington.

== History ==
Initially opened on August 26, 1890, the incline operated for only a few days before breaking down, the original machinery being unable to bear the strain of the large freight and passenger cars. After a second abortive run in October, it was decided that the machinery had to be replaced. The refitted incline opened on March 7, 1891. It ran from Bailey Avenue west of Haberman Avenue down to Carson Street just west of Arlington Avenue.

The oldest part of the Pittsburgh and Castle Shannon Railroad was a coal mine in Mount Washington. When the mine was played out in 1861, the company opened the back (south) side of the mine and continued it down a horseshoe curve into the Saw Mill Run valley to other coal mines. The company began passenger service in 1874 to develop towns at Fair Haven (Overbrook) and Castle Shannon. Trains ran up the old incline, through the enlarged coal mine tunnel, down the slope and horseshoe curve, and through the valley. Improvements starting in 1890 replaced the route over Mount Washington with the new incline, which became known as Castle Shannon Incline No. 1 when a second less steep incline was built on the south side as Castle Shannon Incline No. 2 in 1892. From that date, the old incline, the coal tunnel, and the railroad down through the horseshoe curve were used only for coal trains and not passengers.

The incline's large cars were able to carry both passengers and wagons, and later automobiles. In 1909, steam railroad passenger service on the Pittsburgh and Castle Shannon Railroad was replaced by electric cars of the Pittsburgh Railways that ran through the Mount Washington Transit Tunnel (still in use today). No longer part of a through route, Incline No. 2 soon became superfluous, but development of a residential area on top of Mount Washington kept Incline No. 1 in business. Originally steam powered, it was converted to electrical operation in 1918 by the Otis Elevator Company. Following much deliberation in the 1950s, the incline was closed June 21, 1964.

== Visible remnants ==
The site of the bottom of the incline is still visible as a gravel slope next to Carson Street where the bus lane joins. Up from there, it passes under existing bridges carrying a railroad, East Sycamore Street, and the P. J. McArdle Roadway. Farther up, Cola Street ends at the incline site. The bottom is near the now-popular Station Square.

== See also ==
- List of funicular railways
- List of inclines in Pittsburgh
