= Mount Washington Transit Tunnel =

Public transportation tunnel in Pittsburgh, Pennsylvania, USA

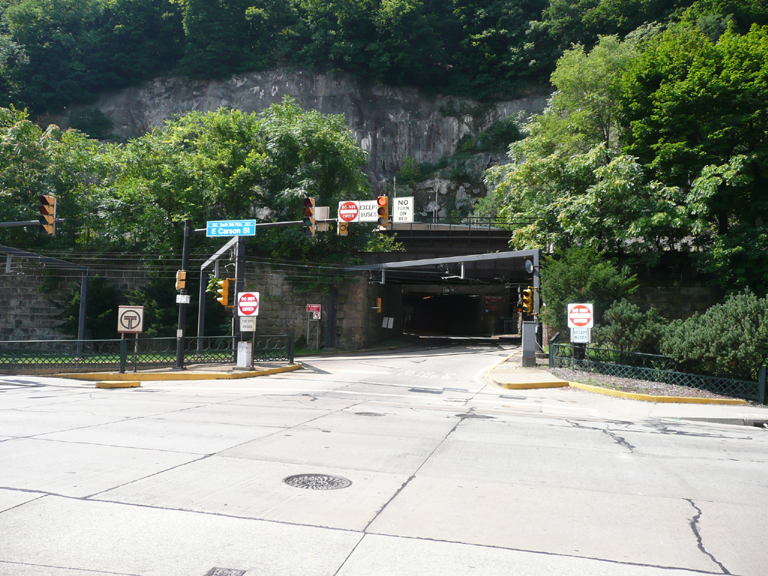
- North portal to the tunnel
- Interactive map of Mount Washington Transit Tunnel

Overview
- Other name: Mount Washington Trolley Tunnel
- Line: Blue Line; Red Line; Silver Line; South Busway
- Location: Pittsburgh, Pennsylvania, U.S.A.
- Status: Operational
- System: Pittsburgh Light Rail
- Start: Station Square
- End: South Hills Junction

Operation
- Work began: October 6, 1902
- Opened: December 1, 1904
- Operator: Pittsburgh Regional Transit

Technical
- Design engineer: Amos D. Neeld
- No. of tracks: 2
- Track gauge: 5 ft 2 1/2 in (1,588 mm) Pennsylvania trolley gauge

The Mount Washington Transit Tunnel is a tunnel for buses and light rail trains under Mount Washington in Pittsburgh, Pennsylvania. The Mount Washington Transit Tunnel is a central component of the Pittsburgh public transit system operated by Pittsburgh Regional Transit, providing a direct connection between Downtown Pittsburgh and the South Hills suburbs. The tunnel was built for the trolley services of Pittsburgh Railways, the predecessor of the modern-day Pittsburgh Light Rail system, and has been used exclusively for public transit since its construction.

The tunnel, formerly known as the Mount Washington Trolley Tunnel, opened for trolleys in 1904, and was converted to a shared rail-bus tunnel in 1973. It has been the only transit-only tunnel shared by rail and buses since 2019, when the Downtown Seattle Transit Tunnel closed to buses.

The construction of the Mount Washington Transit Tunnel was instrumental in the development of the South Hills, as it shortened travel times to Downtown Pittsburgh significantly. Today, the tunnel still provides a significant time savings for transit services; the alternate surface route for light rail trains, the former Brown Line, adds over 8 minutes of travel time compared to the tunnel.

== Services ==
The Mount Washington Transit Tunnel is used by light rail trains and local, regional, and express bus services. All trains and most buses stop at the Station Square and South Hills Junction stations at either end of the tunnel. The tunnel is served by all currently operating lines of the Pittsburgh Light Rail system: the Red, Blue, and Silver Lines, and the Subway Local shuttle service. As of November 2024, the tunnel is also used by 15 bus routes, including 10 routes operated by PRT and 5 by other carriers.

=== Pittsburgh Regional Transit bus ===
Route	Route Name	Destination	Hours of service
39	Brookline	Brookline	Daily
40	Mt. Washington	Duquesne Heights	Daily
41	Bower Hill	Bridgeville	Daily
44	Knoxville	St. Clair/Baldwin	Daily
51L	Carrick	Downtown	Weekday mornings (inbound only)
Y1	Large Flyer	Large	Monday–Saturday
Y45	Baldwin Manor Flyer	South Park	Weekday peak periods
Y46	Elizabeth Flyer	Elizabeth	Daily
Y47	Curry Flyer	CCAC South	Weekday peak periods
Y49	Prospect Flyer	CCAC South	Daily

=== Other bus carriers ===
Operator	Route	Destination	Hours of service
Mid Mon Valley Transit Authority	Commuter A	Donora via Charleroi/Finleyville	Daily
Mid Mon Valley Transit Authority	Commuter Express 1	Donora	Weekday peak periods
Mid Mon Valley Transit Authority	Commuter Express 2	Donora via Charleroi	Weekday peak periods
Mid Mon Valley Transit Authority	Cal Commuter	PennWest California	Weekday peak periods (during academic year)
Freedom Transit	Metro Commuter	Washington	Weekdays

== History ==
=== Background ===
The City of Pittsburgh was incorporated in 1816, and the suburbs of the South Hills developed quickly in the late 19th century. As development progressed, demand grew for better transport options over Mount Washington, a significant geographical obstacle between the coal-rich South Hills and the city.

The Pittsburgh and Castle Shannon Railroad began operating through service across Mount Washington in 1874, using two pieces of former coal transport infrastructure. Steam-powered commuter trains from Castle Shannon ran through the mountain via the Pittsburgh and Castle Shannon Tunnel, a former coal mine converted to a narrow-gauge railroad tunnel. Trains through the tunnel connected passengers to the Pittsburgh and Castle Shannon Plane on Mount Washington's northern face. In the early 1890s, the P&CS built the Castle Shannon Incline No. 1 and No. 2 on the respective southern and northern slopes of Mount Washington, removing the need for the narrow, dark, and smoky tunnel.

Local transport services within Pittsburgh city limits were powered by horses from the 1840s onward, first with omnibuses running on wooden wheels, and later horsecars with steel wheels on steel rails. Cable cars and electric trolleys debuted in the city the late 1880s, causing a revolution in land use and transport policy, but by the end of the 19th century, the inclines on Mount Washington were the best technology for their geography. The inclines began the process of integrating the formerly isolated neighborhood of Mount Washington with the rest of the city, and the advent of electric trolley service would continue the process of the expansion of the City of Pittsburgh.

Less than 20 years after the introduction of the electric trolley, in January 1902, the Pittsburgh Railways Company was formed from the merger of multiple electric trolley and interurban operators. The Pittsburgh Railways represented technological advancement in the transport business, a notable contrast with the Pittsburgh and Castle Shannon Railroad. The P&CS chose not to electrify its lines, as it was a vertically integrated company which produced high-quality coal from mines it owned. It instead chose to continue burning coal to power its steam locomotives and inclines.

=== Construction ===
At the turn of the 20th century, two related but competing firms sought to build a tunnel for trolleys through Mount Washington. Political boss William Flinn controlled Pittsburgh politics during the late 19th century, and two companies were granted a state charter to construct a tunnel through Mount Washington for electric trolleys. The two companies, the Mount Washington Tunnel Company and the Pittsburg Tunnel Company (an affiliate of Flinn-owned Beechwood Improvement Company), became engaged in a legal dispute in April 1902. The Mount Washington Tunnel Co. hired Flinn-founded construction firm Booth and Flinn to construct its tunnel, and it came into conflict with the Pittsburg Tunnel Co. about which firm could proceed with building its tunnel. In 1903, Pittsburgh Railways intervened and took control of the project, investing millions of dollars into the Mount Washington Tunnel Co. and settling the dispute with the Pittsburg Tunnel Co.

Construction proceeded at a rapid pace, with workers working six days a week to bore through the solid rock of the Casselman Formation. Once the boring of the tunnel was complete, construction began on the lining and the rails, using 12 million bricks. Tests of trolleys through the tunnel began in late 1904, and service through the tunnel began on December 1, 1904.

=== Pittsburgh Railways era (1904–1964) ===
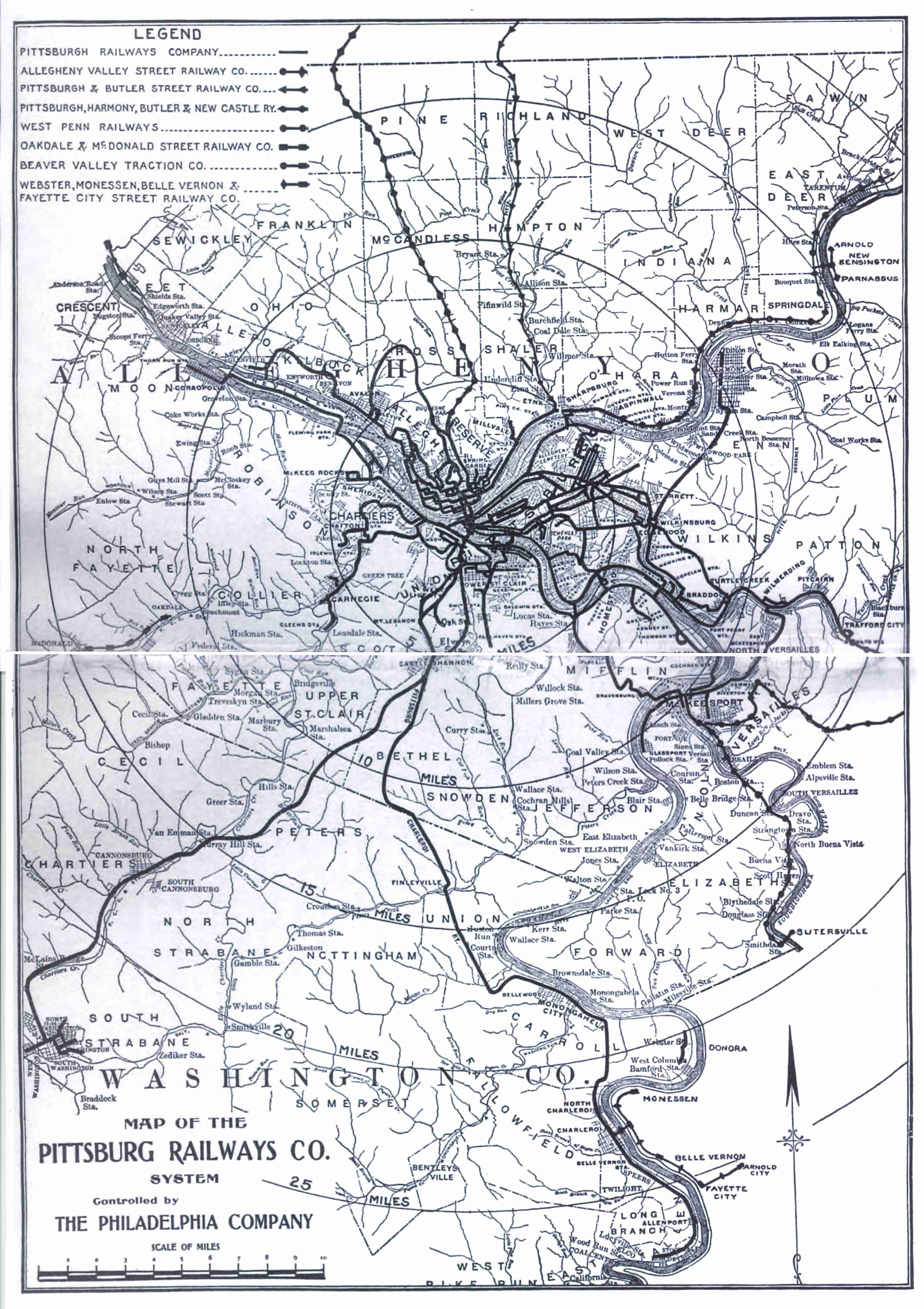
Map of Pittsburgh Railways lines, 1910. Lines operating through the Mount Washington tunnel include the two southernmost lines to Washington County.

Pittsburgh Railways, the tunnel's operator, was never a money-making enterprise. From its inception, it was financially backed by The Philadelphia Company, a utility company founded by George Westinghouse that was the predecessor of Equitable Gas and Duquesne Light. Investments from the United Railways Investment Company, a New Jersey firm, allowed Pittsburgh Railways to lease the Pittsburgh and Castle Shannon Railroad beginning in 1905. Pittsburgh Railways converted the P&CS' narrow-gauge main line to dual gauge and electrified it, allowing its Pennsylvania trolley gauge trolleys to operate during daytime alongside nighttime steam-powered coal trains. Service through the tunnel to Castle Shannon, Charleroi, and Washington began in 1909, operating directly from the rural South Hills to Downtown Pittsburgh via the tunnel and the Smithfield Street Bridge.

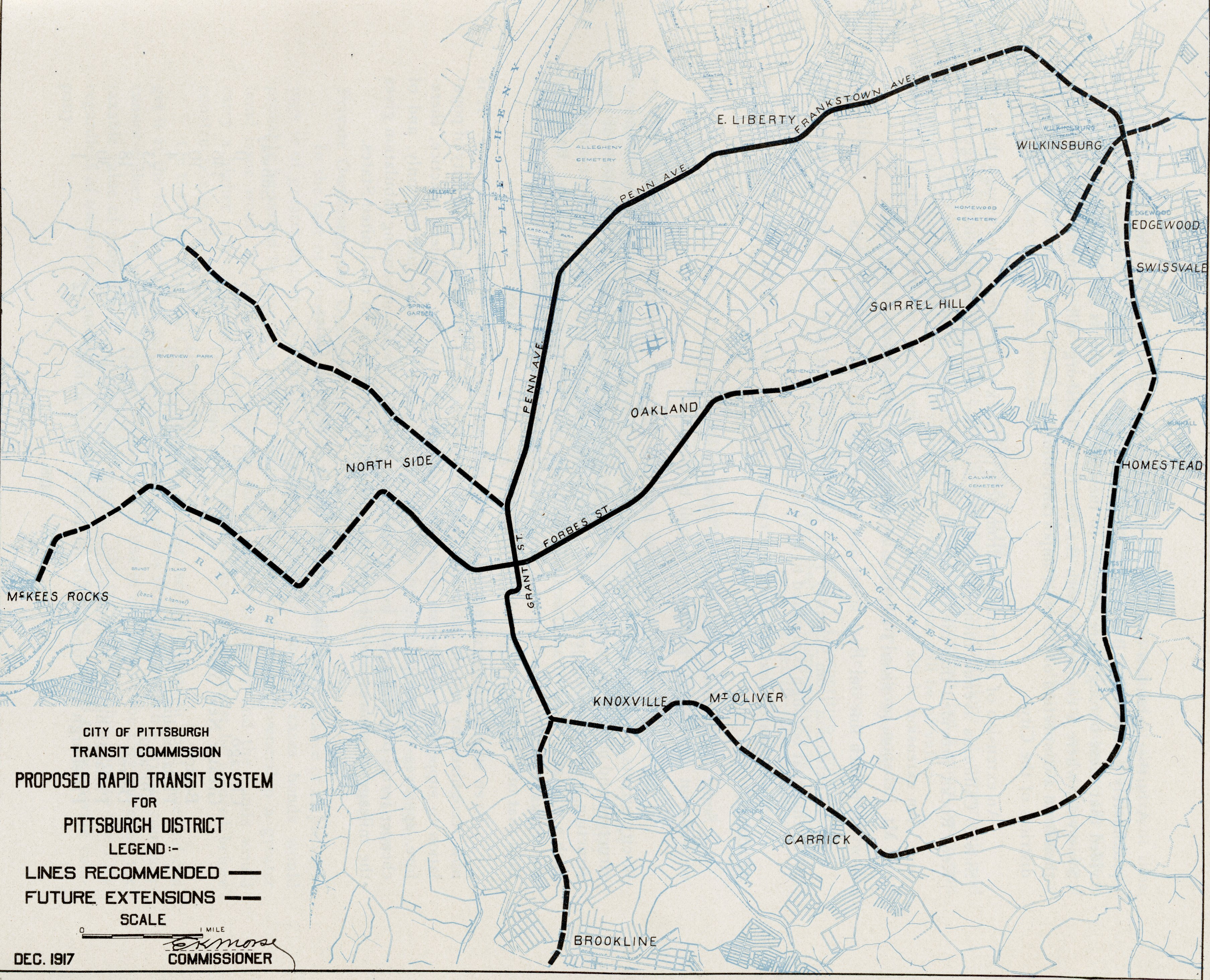
Map of the 1917 rapid transit proposal, with the Mount Washington tunnel at center

By 1910, Pittsburgh Railways was struggling financially. Its policy of a flat five-cent fare (Note: equivalent to $1.73 in 2025) for all lines contributed to the difficulties, as short-distance passengers in city limits effectively subsidized long-distance passengers to outlying areas. The Pittsburgh City Council commissioned a report in 1910 on converting some trolley lines to rapid transit, which was theorized to attract more passengers and reverse the downward trend of the trolley system. The 1910 plan was never implemented. Another plan, presented by city transit commissioner E. K. Morse in 1917, included the Mount Washington tunnel as a centerpiece of a loop of rapid transit elevated and subway lines connecting Downtown, Swissvale, Homestead, Carrick, and Mount Oliver.

On Christmas Eve 1917, an out-of-control trolley crashed at the tunnel's northern portal, killing 21 and injuring 80. The cost of the crash was stifling for Pittsburgh Railways, which entered receivership from 1918 to 1924. The opening of the Liberty Tubes through Mount Washington in 1924 compounded these troubles, as automobile access through Mount Washington became easier and faster. Ridership briefly rebounded during World War II, but by the 1950s the Pittsburgh Railways system was growing smaller. The Washington and Charleroi interurban lines were retired in 1953, ending the through service that motivated the tunnel's construction. Local services through the tunnel continued, as Pittsburgh Railways converted more of its city trolley lines to buses in the 1950s.

=== Port Authority era (1964–2022) ===
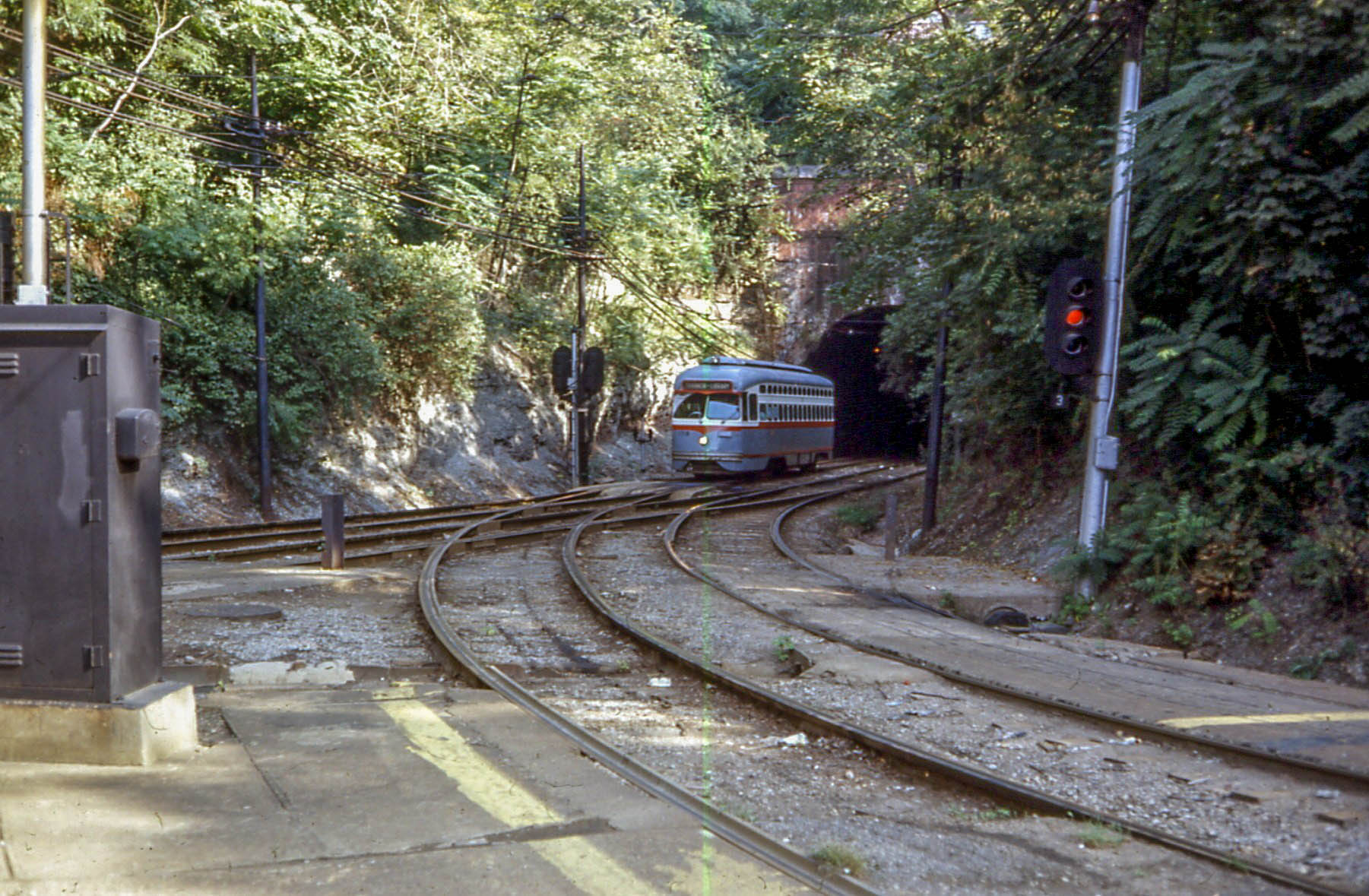
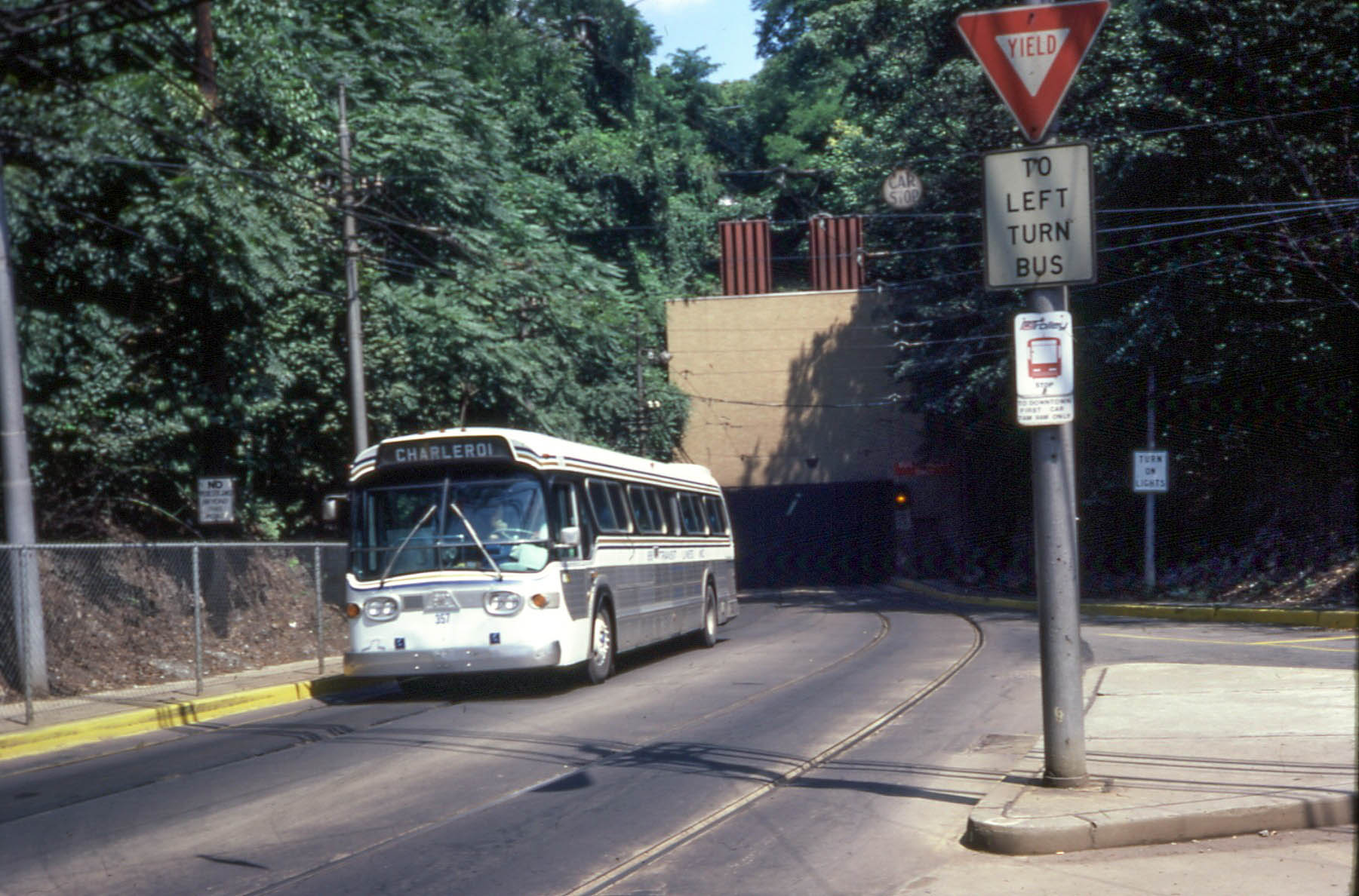
Views of the tunnel's south portal from South Hills Junction station, showing the pavement added for buses

The Port Authority of Allegheny County took over the Pittsburgh transit system, including Pittsburgh Railways and dozens of privately owned bus companies, in 1964. The Port Authority converted more trolley lines to buses, and by 1971, the only remaining trolleys were the Drake, Library, Castle Shannon, Mount Lebanon, and Arlington lines. These services either used the Mount Washington tunnel, or had other exclusive rights-of-way such as bridges that were unsuitable for conversion.

Pavement was added to the Mount Washington tunnel in the 1970s, allowing buses to use the tunnel. The South Busway, one of the first American examples of bus rapid transit, opened from South Hills Junction Station to Overbrook in 1977, connected to the tunnel's southern portal. By 1980, the tunnel was at capacity, with decades-old PCC trolleys sharing the tunnel with increasing numbers of buses. The construction of the South Busway and numerous park and ride lots throughout the South Hills increased ridership substantially, with 1979 ridership levels increasing above the previous peak of 1946 on some lines in the South Hills.

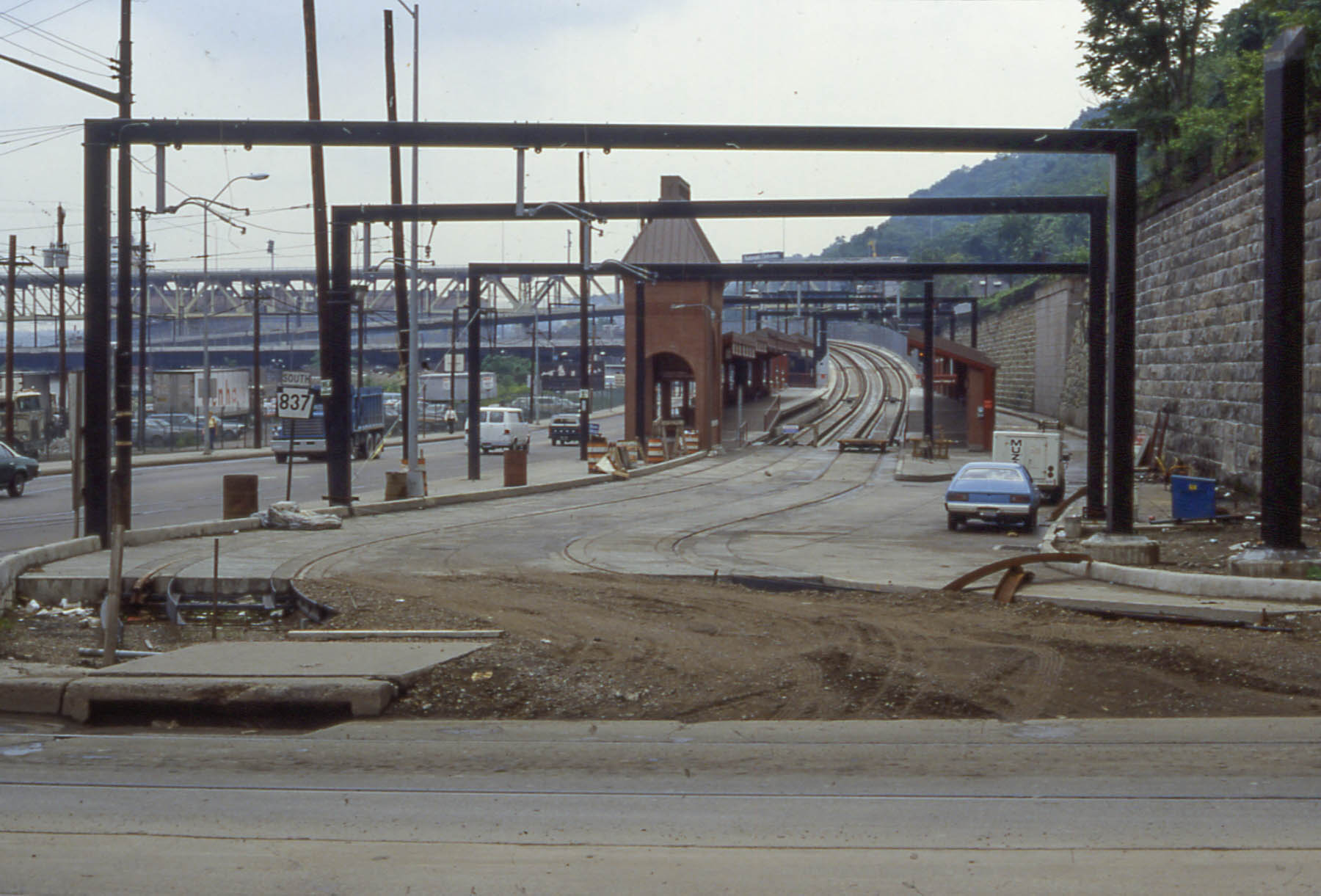
Construction on the new Station Square station at the tunnel's north portal, 1985

The Mount Washington tunnel became a key component of the new Pittsburgh Light Rail system when it was approved in 1980, succeeding the failed Skybus system. The light rail system rebuilt and improved the remaining trolley system, including the purchase of new rolling stock and the creation of a new trolley tunnel in Downtown Pittsburgh. As part of the Pittsburgh Light Rail construction, trolleys exiting the Mount Washington tunnel to the north were rerouted onto the Panhandle Bridge, and the tracks on the Smithfield Street Bridge were removed and paved over in 1985.

Another major incident occurred in 1987, when a trolley entering the tunnel from the south experienced a brake failure. The trolley built up speed through the tunnel and left the rails at the north portal, riding on the pavement until it came to a stop on the southern approach of the Smithfield Street Bridge. 37 people were injured, with no fatalities.

=== Pittsburgh Regional Transit era (2022–present) ===
The Port Authority of Allegheny County rebranded itself as Pittsburgh Regional Transit in 2022. PRT continues to operate the Mount Washington tunnel for light rail and bus services.

PRT announced in July 2024 that it would close the tunnel for 5 months in 2025 to replace concrete, rails, and electrical wiring. During the closure, trains will be rerouted onto the former Brown Line through Allentown, bypassing Station Square and resuming their normal route at First Avenue station.

== Geology ==
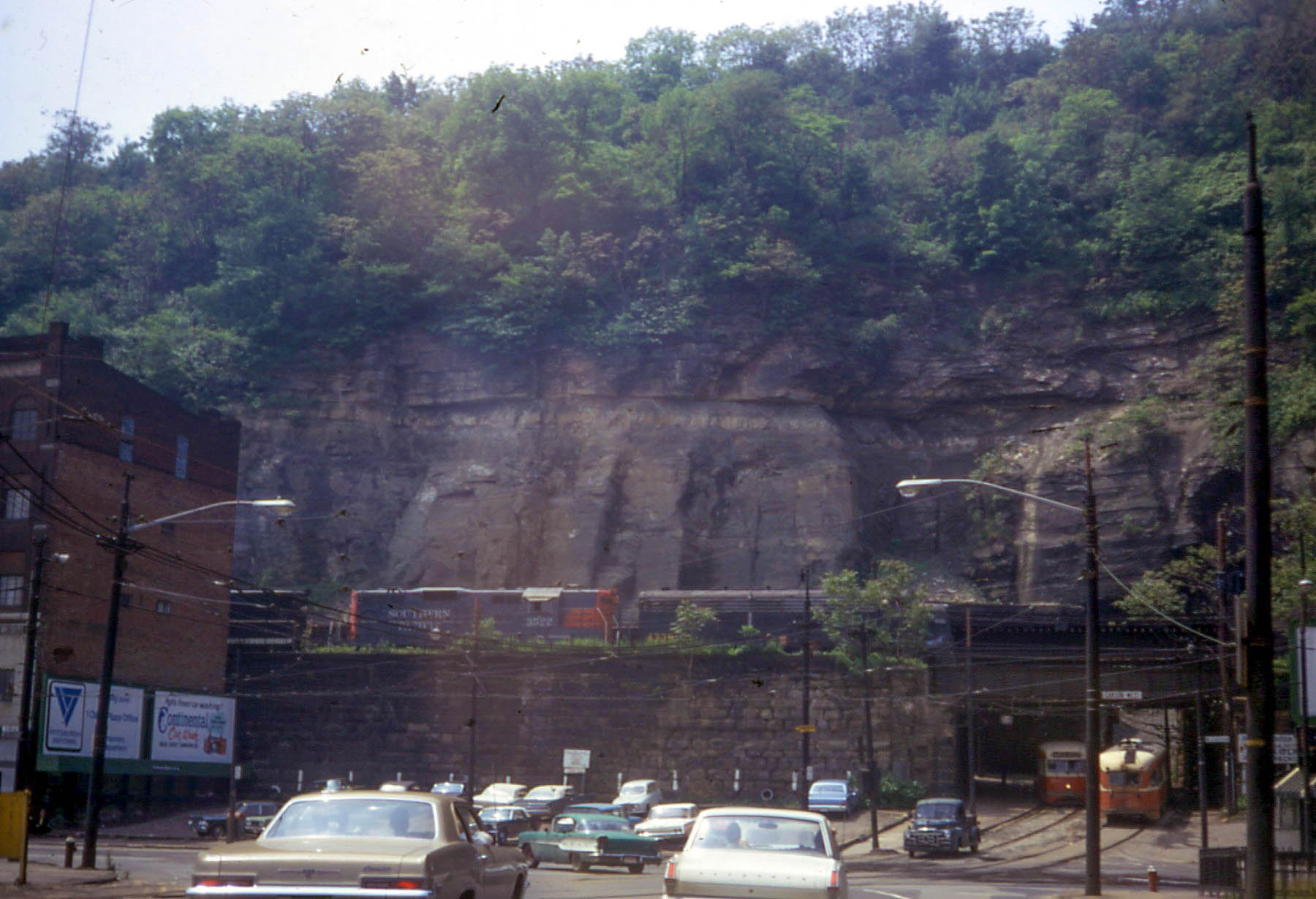
Exposed rock is visible above the tunnel's northern portal, with a Pennsylvania Railroad train on the Mon Line passing through, 1968

The Mount Washington Transit Tunnel rises from Station Square to South Hills Junction through Mount Washington, a hill located in a moderately dissected region of the Appalachian Plateau. The tunnel passes through two geological formations: the Glenshaw Formation and the Casselman Formation, both part of the Conemaugh Group. The Ames Limestone member, a thin marker bed of limestone that uniquely identifies the youngest layer of marine transgression in the area, is present at the tunnel's northern portal.

From the northern portal at Station Square, the tunnel rises through the entire Casselman Formation, emerging at South Hills Junction. At the southern portal, the Pittsburgh Light Rail tracks rise above the Pittsburgh Formation, the layer of coal that defined the early growth of Pittsburgh. High-quality coal from the Pittsburgh Formation powered the trains of the Pittsburgh and Castle Shannon Railroad, beginning the development of the South Hills and leading to the construction of the Mount Washington tunnel.

== Incidents ==
Two spectacular runaway accidents are associated with the tunnel, which has a steep grade of approximately 6%. In both instances, trolleys entering from the south tunnel ran downhill, lost control, jumped the tracks at the north portal, and crashed.

=== 1917 crash ===
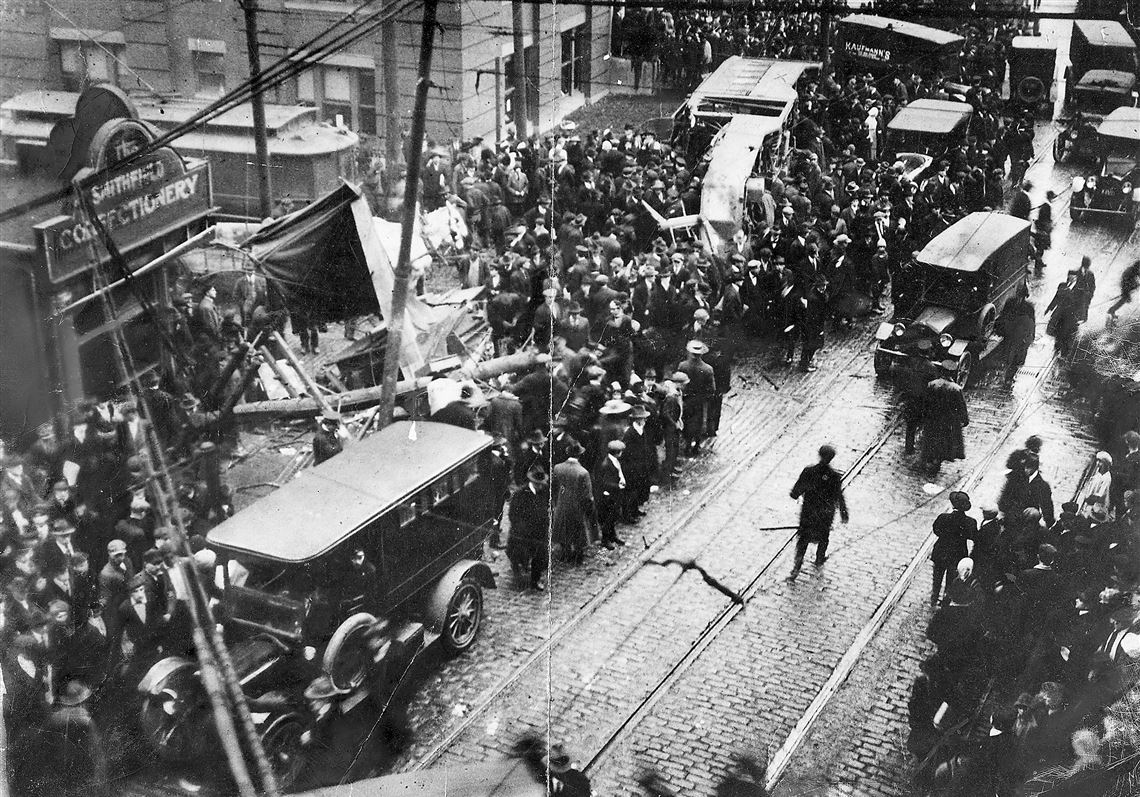
Scene of the 1917 crash: the trolley involved sits overturned, with its roof ripped off

A fatal incident occurred on Christmas Eve 1917, when a trolley on the Knoxville line crashed at the north portal of the Mount Washington tunnel. 23 people died as a result of the crash, and the resulting claims sent Pittsburgh Railways into receivership for years.

The trolley involved in the 1917 crash, car #4236, a low-floor, double-ended trolley, was built as part of the Pittsburgh Railways 4200 series by the St. Louis Car Company in 1914. The 4200 series cars had a nominal passenger capacity of 55 seated and 29 standing, but the trolley on Christmas Eve was overloaded, with a total of 117 passengers onboard. After the trolley entered the tunnel from the south portal, the trolley pole came off the overhead line, cutting off power and stopping the car. The trolley was so crowded that the conductor could not leave his station to guide the trolley pole back onto the line, and an argument ensued between the conductor and the motorman about whose duty it was to adjust the pole. The argument continued for multiple minutes until the motorman of a trolley behind the Knoxville car exited his trolley and put the pole back on the wires.

Once power was restored, the motorman of the Knoxville car accelerated at full speed, and the car reached a speed of nearly 50 mph (80 km/h), five times the speed limit. The trolley failed to stop at the north portal of the tunnel, jumped the tracks, and overturned. 14 people died immediately, and the remaining wounded were taken to the nearby Pittsburgh & Lake Erie Railroad Station Terminal Annex, which served as a makeshift hospital. A total of 23 people died in the crash.

=== 1987 derailment ===
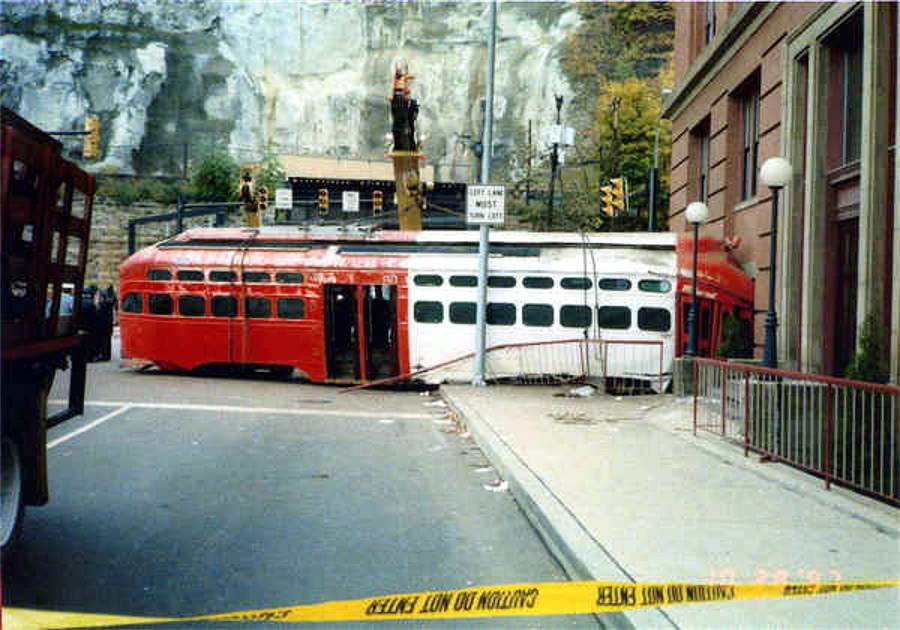
The trolley in the 1987 crash stayed upright after jumping the rails

On October 29, 1987, a 1700-series all-electric PCC car began to exceed the tunnel's speed limit as it entered the south portal after departing South Hills Junction. The operator, realizing the car could neither stop nor take the sharp curve from the transitway to the Panhandle Bridge ramp, ordered all the passengers to move to the back, and radioed the PAT central dispatcher to clear Station Square. The car left the rails and took Smithfield Street instead (the trolleys' original route downtown, until 1985), crossing Carson Street, sideswiping a PAT bus and a truck, and knocking out a fire hydrant. Miraculously, the car stayed on its wheels, and finally stopped next to the Pittsburgh History & Landmarks Foundation, the former Pittsburgh and Lake Erie station building at Station Square.

Thirty-seven people were injured, four seriously, but there were no fatalities. All three braking systems on the car had failed: the drum, dynamic, and magnetic rail brakes. Most of the 1700 series cars were found to have electrical defects, prompting PAT to retire all of their remaining PCC's that had not been rebuilt as 4000 series cars. Consequently, PAT was left with a shortage of cars, which contributed to the closure of the Overbrook line in 1993.

== See also ==
- Pittsburgh Railways
- Pittsburgh Light Rail
- South Busway
- Pittsburgh and Castle Shannon Tunnel
