= Broughton, Pennsylvania =

Unincorporated community in Pennsylvania, US

Broughton, Pennsylvania Curry
- Unincorporated community
- Interactive map of Broughton, Pennsylvania
- Coordinates: 40°19′48″N 79°59′16″W
- Country: United States
- State: Pennsylvania
- County: Allegheny
- Township: South Park
- Elevation: 991 ft (302 m)
- Time zone: UTC−5:00 (EST)
  - Summer (DST): UTC−4:00 (EDT)

Broughton is an unincorporated community in South Park Township, Pennsylvania, United States. Originally named Curry after Joseph Curry, a frontier physician and coroner of Allegheny County in 1810, it was renamed Broughton, to avoid confusion with the nearby Curry Hollow and the Curry in Blair County. It is located at the junction of Brownsville Road, Curry Road, and Broughton Road. Broughton was racially integrated in the early 20th century, due to coal miners working nearby mines in Horning. It was the location of Pittsburgh Terminal Coal Company's No. 5 mine.
