= Pittsburgh and Castle Shannon Plane =

Coordinates: 40.42978°N 80.00248°W

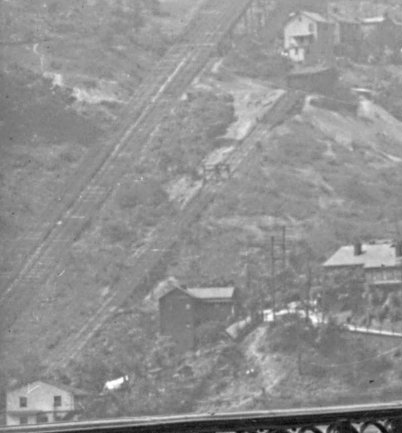
- The incline on the right is the Pittsburgh and Castle Shannon Plane.

Overview
- Locale: Mt. Washington
- Dates of operation: before 1864 (1825-64)–1912
- Successor: Pittsburgh and Castle Shannon Railroad, Pittsburgh Railways

Technical
- Track gauge: 3 ft 4 in (1,016 mm)
- Length: 850 feet (260 m)

The Pittsburgh and Castle Shannon Plane was a 3 ft 4 in (1,016 mm) narrow gauge incline railway that ran from the northern end of the Pittsburgh and Castle Shannon Tunnel to Carson Street in Pittsburgh, Pennsylvania.

== History and notable features ==
Originally built to carry coal from the Jacob Beltzhoover mine, it was sold by the Pittsburgh Coal Company to the Pittsburgh and Castle Shannon Railroad in 1871. It was used only for coal as early as 1864; passenger traffic was added in 1874 for the Pittsburgh and Castle Shannon Railroad.

For safety reasons, the tunnel was closed to passenger traffic, and passengers were diverted to the Castle Shannon Incline, which was built in 1890. Emergency use of the plane for passengers and freight continued as late as 1900. Its use for the transport of passengers and freight other than coal was made obsolete by the Mount Washington Transit Tunnel.

Operation as a coal incline continued until May 1, 1912.

It was operated as a gravity plane, with returning empty cars being pulled to the mine mouth by the weight of the descending full coal cars.
