= Saw Mill Run =

Stream in Pennsylvania, USA

Saw Mill Run Tributary to Ohio River
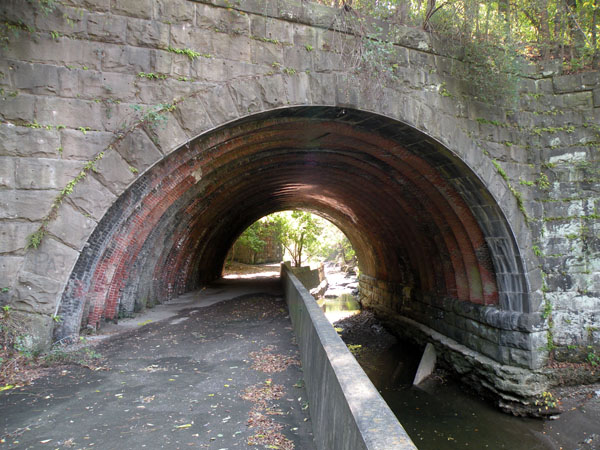
- The Seldom Seen Arch, built in 1903, over Saw Mill Run along Saw Mill Run Boulevard not far from Woodruff Street in the Beechview neighborhood of Pittsburgh, Pennsylvania

- Location of Saw Mill Run mouth Saw Mill Run (the United States)

Location
- Country: United States
- State: Pennsylvania
- County: Allegheny County
- City: Pittsburgh
- Borough/Township: Castle Shannon; Mt. Lebanon

Physical characteristics
- Source: McLaughlin Run divide
  - location: Mt. Lebanon, Pennsylvania
  - coordinates: 40°21′14″N 080°02′24″W
  - elevation: 1,250 ft (380 m)
- Mouth: Ohio River
  - location: Saw Mill Run Boulevard and Carson Street, Pittsburgh, Pennsylvania
  - coordinates: 40°26′41″N 080°01′39″W
  - elevation: 710 ft (220 m)
- Length: 9.12 mi (14.68 km)
- Basin size: 19.42 square miles (50.3 km^{2})
- Discharge
  - location: Ohio River
  - average: 19.57 cu ft/s (0.554 m^{3}/s) at mouth with Ohio River

Basin features
- Progression: northeast then northwest
- River system: Ohio River
- Tributaries
  - left: unnamed tributaries
  - right: unnamed tributaries
- Bridges: Santa Fe Drive, Caswell Drive, Milford Drive (x2), Connor Road, Willow Avenue, Canal Street, Castle Shannon Boulevard, Killarney Drive, PA 88, Kingwood Street, PA 51 (x2), Whited Street, PA 51, Fawn Street, Fine Way. PA 51, Edgebrook Avenue, PA 51 (x2), Crane Avenue, I-376, Miniotte Square, Neptune Street, S Main Street, PA 51

Saw Mill Run is a tributary of the Ohio River in Pennsylvania. It is an urban stream, and lies entirely within Allegheny County, Pennsylvania. The stream enters the Ohio just downstream from the Forks of the Ohio in Pittsburgh, at a place that was founded as the town of Temperanceville in the 1830s. It provides an entry through the elevated plateau south of Pittsburgh known as the South Hills, and land transportation has paralleled the stream since the nineteenth century.

The stream is named for an actual saw mill that operated near the mouth of the stream where it empties into the Ohio River. The first reference to the mill is in relation to the construction of Fort Pitt (1759–1761). The mill provided much of the lumber used in the construction of the new Fort, after the British claimed the area from the French and destroyed Fort Duquesne.

== Railroads ==
The Coal Hill Coal Railroad crossed the stream on a trestle, and extended upstream in 1861. This railroad was purchased by the Pittsburgh and Castle Shannon Railroad, who extended the line to follow the main stream of Saw Mill Run from the Pittsburgh and Castle Shannon Tunnel to Castle Shannon, Pennsylvania. The Little Saw Mill Run Railroad followed the west branch of the stream towards Mt. Lebanon, Pennsylvania.

The Wheeling and Lake Erie Railway (W&LE) operated a short rail line on the western end of the stream, known as the West End Branch. It had been used by the Pittsburgh and West Virginia Railway as a connection with the Pittsburgh and Lake Erie Railroad near West Carson Street. The W&LE operated it until late 2008, and most of the line has been torn up, with the crossing signal cantilevers on Steuben Street being removed in 2012.

== Trolley and light rail ==
The right of way of the Pittsburgh and Castle Shannon, excluding the Pittsburgh and Castle Shannon Tunnel through a coal mine, was leased by Pittsburgh Railways in 1905, and later purchased in 1950. The railroad ran with a dual gauge system, with coal trains continuing to run on the narrow gauge, and at night, and trolleys on a wider gauge. The right of way is part of the Pittsburgh Light Rail transportation system today, which follows the stream from near the South Hills Junction (PAT station) to Castle Shannon, Pennsylvania.

== Highways ==
Part of Pennsylvania Route 51 runs parallel to the stream, and this section is known as Saw Mill Run Boulevard.

== Watershed ==
The watershed of Saw Mill Run covers 12,432 acres (50.31 km^{2}), or about 19 square miles (49 km^{2}). The main stream is 9.3 miles (15.0 km) long, and drains parts of Bethel Park, Castle Shannon, Mount Oliver, and the city of Pittsburgh.

== See also ==
- List of rivers of Pennsylvania
