= Mount Washington, Pittsburgh (hill) =

Hill in Pittsburgh, Pennsylvania, USA

Mount Washington
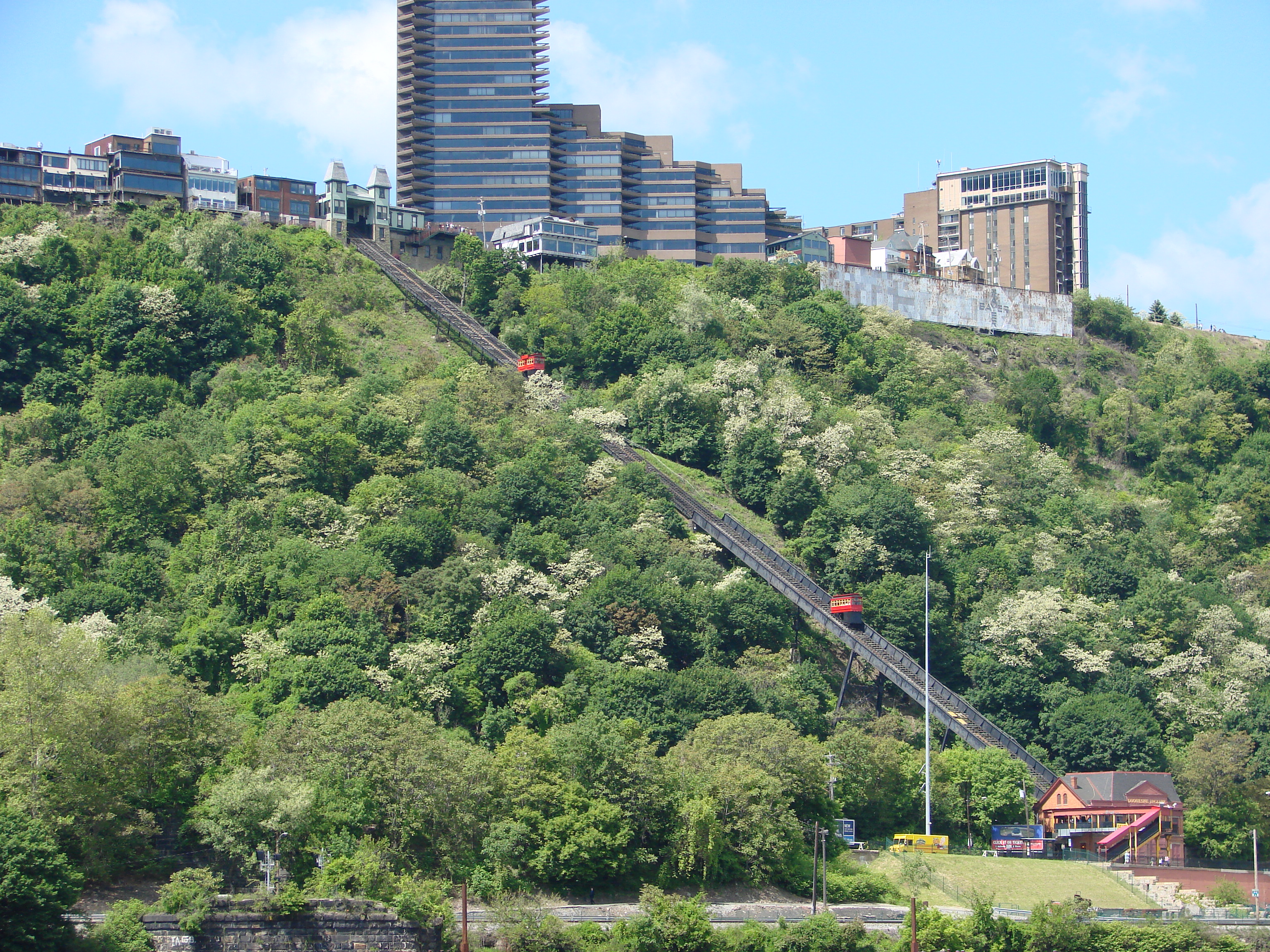

Highest point
- Coordinates: 40.4271°N 80.0112°W

Geography
- Location: Pittsburgh

Mount Washington is a hill in Pittsburgh, on the southern banks of the Monongahela River and Ohio River.

== History ==
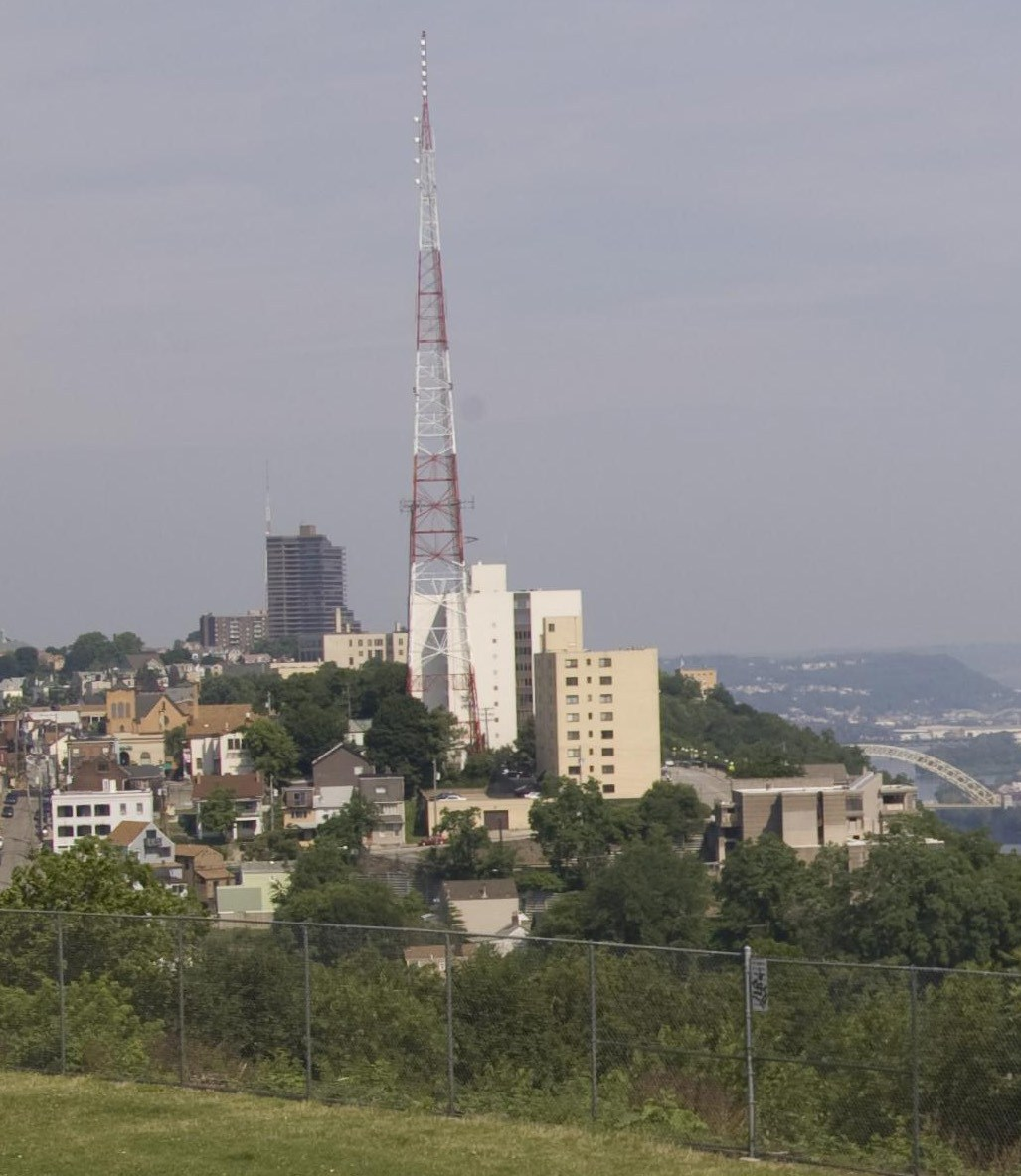
A view of Mount Washington from Bigbee Street

In the early history of Pittsburgh, Mount Washington was known as Coal Hill. Easy access to the Pittsburgh coal seam's outcrop near the base of Mount Washington allowed several mines to operate there. Also, rock was quarried from the hill. Gray sandstone, for example, was quarried at Coal Hill for the second Allegheny County Courthouse.

By 1876, the name had been changed to Mount Washington, and a year later, the view of the City of Pittsburgh was first drawn from Mount Washington. Many photos of the Pittsburgh skyline are from Mount Washington, due to the elevation of the hill overlooking the river valley and Downtown Pittsburgh below.

== Inclines ==
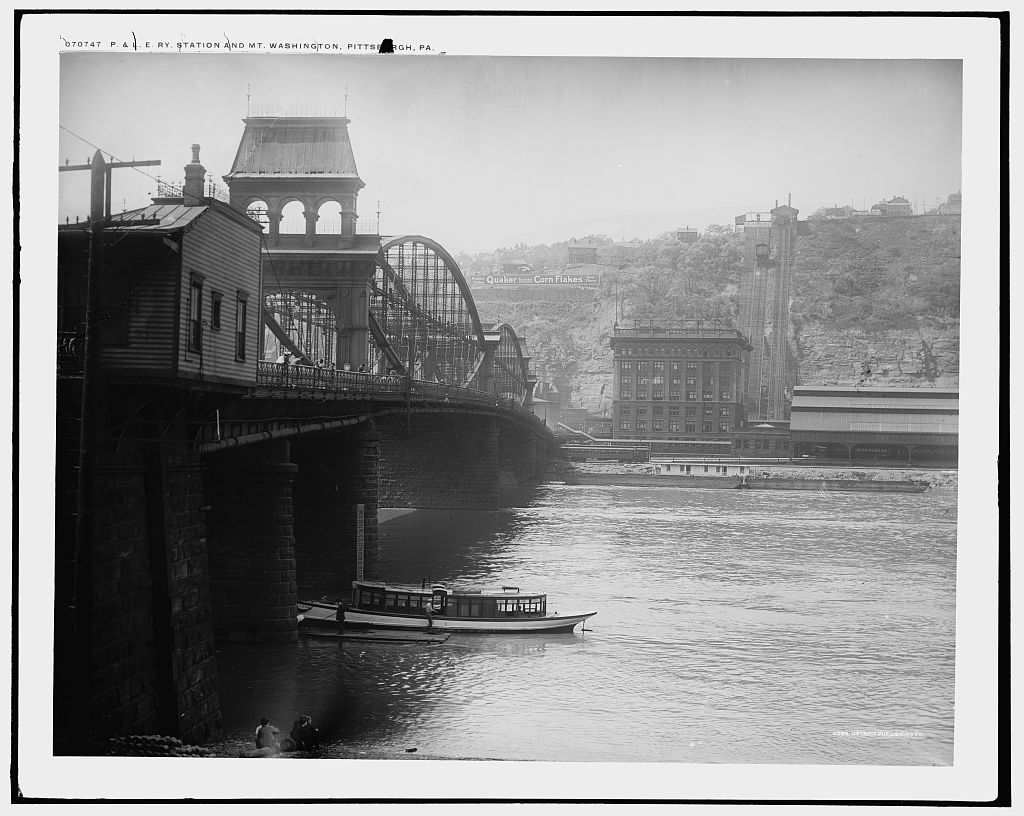
P. & L.E. Ry. Pittsburgh and Lake Erie Railroad station and the Monongahela Incline on Mount Washington, c. 1905

The original switchback trails that wound up the steep slopes of Mount Washington were barely passable to a team of horses pulling a loaded wagon. Immigrants, predominantly from Germany, settled Mount Washington by the early 19th century and worked in the plants adjacent to the Monongahela River. They became weary of climbing steep footpaths and steps to their homes, from the river valley, after work. They remembered the standseilbahns (inclines) of their former country, and proposals were advanced to construct one or more of them along Coal Hill. The Monongahela Incline was the first of these to be built in 1869–1870. The Duquesne Incline opened to the public in May 1877, and it was one of four inclined planes climbing Mount Washington that carried passengers and freight to the residential area that had spread along the top of the bluff. As the hilltop communities were virtually inaccessible by any other means, many of Pittsburgh's inclines carried horses and wagons as well as foot passengers. All carried some light freight. A third incline, the Castle Shannon Incline, which closed in 1964, also served the hilltop community on Mount Washington with a lower station at the corner of East Carson Street and Arlington Avenue, just east of the present Station Square Transit Station. This incline was closed by its owner, the Pittsburgh Railways Company, just prior to all of their streetcar and bus routes being taken over by the Port Authority.

The Monongahela and Duquesne Inclines allow access to Mount Washington's overlook of the downtown area of Pittsburgh. Tourists experience the view while riding two of only a few remaining inclines in the country. The inclines remain the best way for thousands of Pittsburghers on Mount Washington to get to their jobs, entertainment and shopping in downtown Pittsburgh and Station Square.

== Pittsburgh sign ==
In the 1930s, a huge neon billboard sign, 226 feet wide and 30 feet high, was erected on the Mount Washington hillside near the Duquesne Incline tracks. Its earliest known advertisers were Iron City Beer, Clark's Teaberry Gum and WTAE-TV Channel 4. In 1967, the Alcoa aluminum company took over the sign and changed its plain background into a gray-and-white mosaic font pattern that spelled out "PITTSBURGH" when seen in the daytime, giving the sign new popularity. Alcoa became the sign's most well-known advertiser, remaining for the next 25 years. In 1992, Miles Laboratories moved their U.S. headquarters from Elkhart, Indiana to Pittsburgh and became the sign's new advertiser. In April 1995, the Miles brand name was absorbed by its parent company, Bayer AG and the sign was changed to feature the Bayer name and its circular cross logo. Bayer AG declined to renew their lease on the sign in 2014. As of May 2015, Lamar Advertising and the City of Pittsburgh were in disagreement over the proper use and maintenance responsibilities of the sign.

In June 2016, Lamar Advertising erected a new vinyl sign over the old neon sign for the Sprint Corporation; a gold banner with black letters reading "Pittsburgh WINS with Black & Yellow". Many Pittsburgh natives reacted negatively to the wording "black & yellow" as opposed to the city's traditional "black & gold" moniker. On April 30, 2019, with Sprint's lease on the sign expired by that time, Lamar mounted a new sign bearing an American flag representing the National Flag Foundation, a nonprofit organization based in Pittsburgh. In January 2025, Lamar Advertising updated the billboard again, this time featuring Pond Lehocky Giordano, one of the nation’s largest workers' compensation law firms based in Pennsylvania.

== Beneath Mount Washington ==
The first tunnel through Mount Washington was the Pittsburgh and Castle Shannon Tunnel, which began life as a coal mine but was extended through from the Mount Washington Coal Incline to Saw Mill Run in 1861. This was followed by the Mount Washington Transit Tunnel for Pittsburgh Railways and Wabash Tunnel for the Wabash Pittsburgh Terminal Railway, both opening in 1904. The former continues in use by Pittsburgh Light Rail and the latter as a High Occupancy Vehicle tunnel.

The Liberty Tunnel through Mount Washington opened in 1928.

The Fort Pitt Tunnel beneath and through Mount Washington opened September 1, 1960.

== Gallery ==
Daytime view of the Pittsburgh city from Grandview Avenue
Nighttime view of the Pittsburgh city from Grandview Avenue
