= Horning, Pennsylvania =

Unincorporated community in Pennsylvania, US

- Neighborhood
- Location within Pennsylvania
- Coordinates: 40°20′15″N 79°59′29″W
- Country: United States
- State: Pennsylvania
- County: Allegheny
- Borough: Baldwin
- Elevation: 1,037 ft (316 m)
- Time zone: UTC-5 (Eastern (EST))
  - Summer (DST): UTC-4 (EDT)
- GNIS feature ID: 1177432

Horning is a neighborhood in the borough of Baldwin in Allegheny County, Pennsylvania, United States. It was the residence of miners of the Pittsburgh Terminal Railroad and Coal Company #4 Mine, which had a racially integrated workforce, unusual in that era.

== "D" Mine (Pittsburgh Terminal Coal Company #4) ==
Horning was founded at the opening of a coal mine along the West Side Belt Railroad by the Pittsburg Terminal Coal Company around 1903. In 1905, Philip Murray was elected president of the United Mine Workers of America local in Horning. On February 3, 1926, 20 miners were killed in an explosion in this mine. It was the scene of armed labor unrest in 1928. The mine was closed October 5, 1939.

== Photos ==
- Coal Camp, U.S.A.
