= Pittsburgh and Castle Shannon Railroad =

Railroad in Pennsylvania

Overview
- Locale: Allegheny County, Pennsylvania
- Dates of operation: 1871–1950
- Predecessor: Coal Hill Coal Railroad
- Successor: Pittsburgh Railways

Technical
- Track gauge: 3 ft 4 in (1,016 mm)
- Length: 6.5 miles (10.5 km)

Other
- Website: http://liquala.com/pcs.html

The Pittsburgh and Castle Shannon Railroad was a 3 ft 4 in (1,016 mm) narrow-gauge railroad in Allegheny County, Pennsylvania. Originally built in 1871, it may have been the first American common-carrier narrow-gauge railroad. It purchased a rail line called the Coal Hill Coal Railroad from the Pittsburgh Coal Company, and used a coal mine under Mt. Washington as a tunnel to transport coal from Castle Shannon, Pennsylvania to Pittsburgh. Passenger traffic was added soon afterwards, and the train carried passengers during the day and coal at night. The original plan was to extend the line to Finleyville, Pennsylvania, but the original narrow-gauge line ran only as far as Castle Shannon. The right of way continued as the Pittsburgh, Castle Shannon and Washington Railroad, later to become part of the Pittsburgh Southern Railroad.

In spite of its location above the rivers in Pittsburgh, it sustained flood damage on at least one occasion. The Pittsburgh and Castle Shannon Tunnel was closed to passenger traffic in 1880, but coal trains continued to use it until 1912. Passengers continued to travel over Mt. Washington via two inclines, the Castle Shannon Incline and a "back" incline. The right of way, excluding the tunnel through the coal mine, was leased by Pittsburgh Railways in 1905, and later purchased in 1950. The railroad ran with a dual-gauge system, with coal trains continuing to run on the narrow gauge, and at night, and trolleys on a wider gauge (5 ft 2 1/2 in or 1,588 mm). The right of way is part of the Pittsburgh Light Rail transportation system today, from South Hills Junction to Library, Pennsylvania.

== See also ==
- Pittsburgh and Castle Shannon Tunnel
- Pittsburgh and Castle Shannon Plane
- Castle Shannon Incline
