= Jacob Beltzhoover =

American pioneer (1770–1835)

- Born: May 16, 1770; Washington County, Maryland
- Died: August 7, 1835 (aged 56); Pittsburgh, Pennsylvania
- Spouse: Elizabeth Saams
- Children: Mary Ann, Sarah
- Parent(s): Melchior Beltzhoover, Elizabeth Schunk

Jacob Beltzhoover was a pioneer of St. Clair Township in Allegheny County, Pennsylvania. He and his family received a land grant from the Penn family. He was one of six sons of Melchior Beltzhoover, a tavern keeper from Hagerstown, Maryland who immigrated from Metterzimmern, Germany in 1752.

== Ferry and bridge on the Monongahela ==
Monongahela Bridge
- Coordinates: 40.435135°N 80.001957°W
- Carried: Smithfield Street
- Crossed: Monongahela River
- Locale: Pittsburgh, Pennsylvania
- Preceded by: Beltzhoover Ferry
- Followed by: Roebling's Monongahela Wire Suspension Bridge

Characteristics
- Design: covered bridge
- Material: Wood
- No. of spans: 8 of 1188 feet (57 m)

History
- Constructed by: Louis Wernwag
- Construction end: 21 November 1818
- Opened: 10 October 1818
- Collapsed: north end, 21 January 1832, re-opened 29 October 1832
- Closed: 10 April 1845

Statistics
- Toll: yes

Location
- Interactive map of Monongahela Bridge

References
- Structurae database listing

He owned a ferry that ran from the end of Wood Street across the Monongahela. The ferry was operated by William Graham, who kept a tavern at the northwest corner of Wood and Water Street. The ferry was in operation until 1818, when it was replaced by the Monongahela Bridge, in which he was a shareholder. One of Beltzhoover's coal wagons was on the bridge when it collapsed in 1832. The collapsed north end of the bridge was re-built, and the bridge re-opened on 29 October 1832. The bridge was destroyed in The Great Fire of Pittsburgh on 10 April 1845.

== Mine ==
In 1825, he opened a mine on the northern side of Mt. Washington, across the river from the town of Pittsburgh. This penetrated the hill to the southern side in 1861, and was later enlarged to become the Pittsburgh and Castle Shannon Tunnel.

== Slavery ==
He was a slaveholder, with child slaves registered in the county courthouse.

== Death and interment ==
Beltzhoover died in Pittsburgh, Pennsylvania on August 7, 1835. His grave is located at the Allegheny Cemetery in Pittsburgh (section 16, lot 135).
