= Pittsburgh Coal Company =

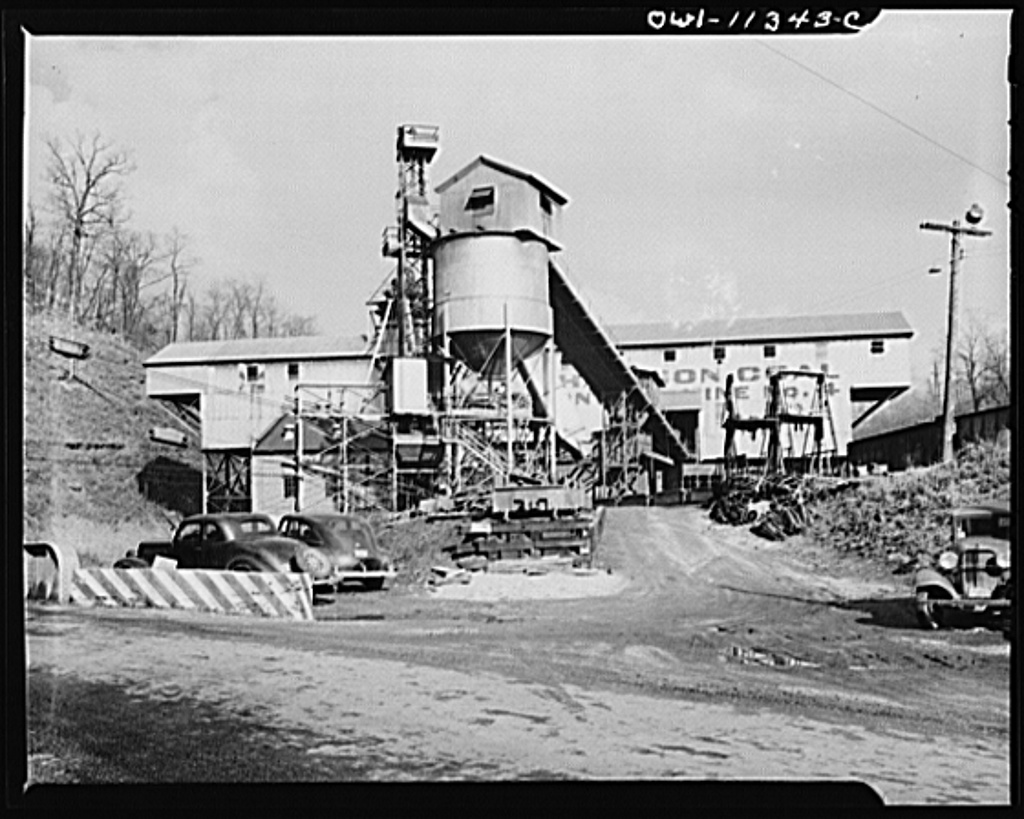
Montour No. 4 Mine in Peters Township, Washington County, Pennsylvania.

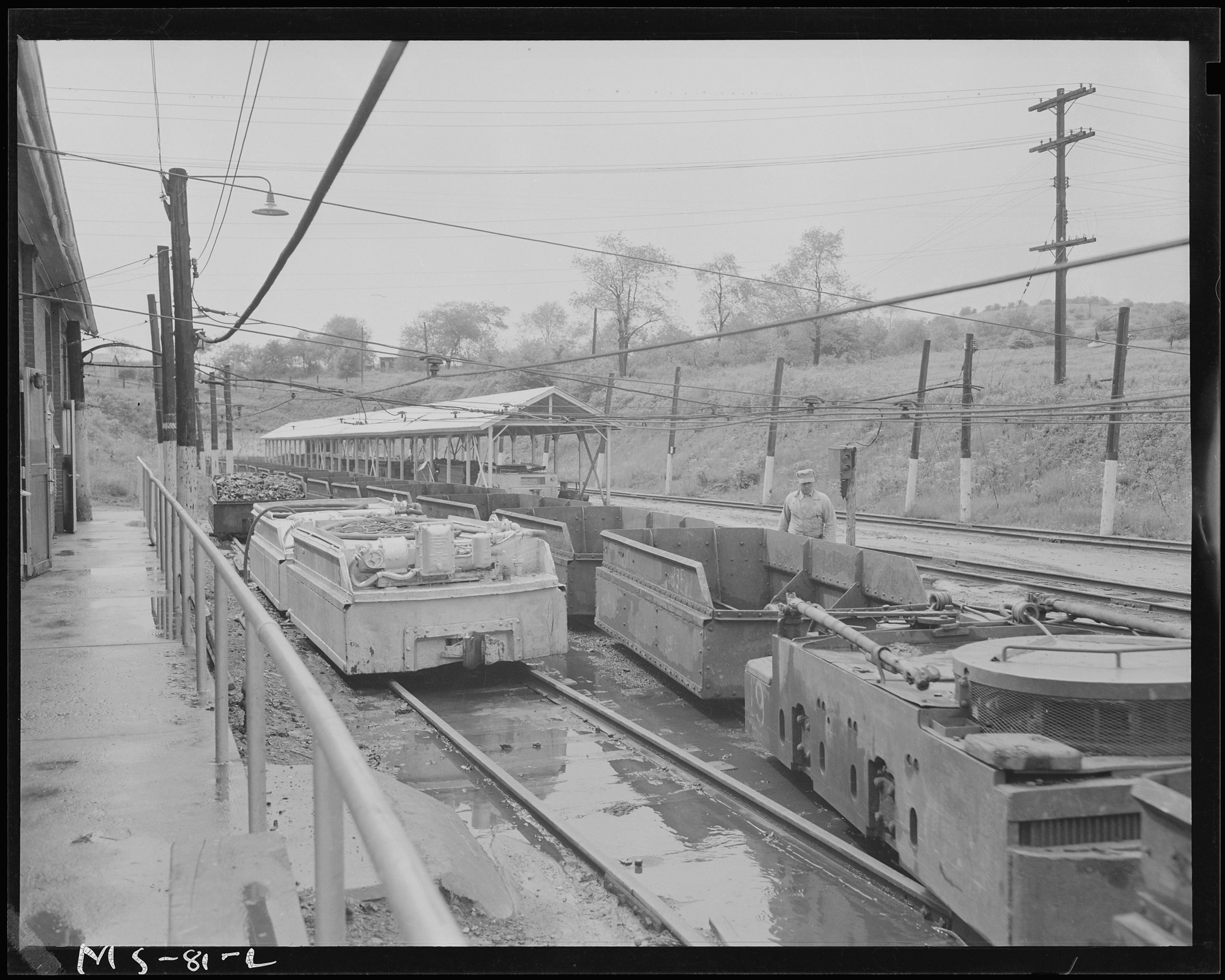
Empty shuttle coal cars, Westland Mine, Washington County, Pennsylvania.

The Pittsburgh Terminal Coal Company was a bituminous coal mining company based in Pittsburgh and controlled by the Mellon family. It operated mines in the Pittsburgh Coalfield, including mines in Becks Run and Horning, Pennsylvania. Unusually for that time in Pennsylvania, it hired African-American miners for some of its work.

== History ==
The Pittsburgh Terminal Coal Company was a trust incorporated in New Jersey in 1899 by leading Pittsburgh industrialists, including Andrew W. Mellon, Henry W. Oliver, and Henry Clay Frick. Although a New Jersey corporation, it operated only in the Pittsburgh area. At its inception, the company took control of over 80 coal businesses and 80,000 acres (32,000 ha) of land on both sides of the Monongahela River.

Pittsburgh Terminal Coal ran numerous coal mines in Allegheny County during the early 20th century.

It operated the Darr Mine in Westmoreland County, Pennsylvania.

In 1915, it merged with the Monongahela River Consolidated Coal and Coke Company. In 1945 it merged with Consolidation Coal Company, controlled by the Rockefeller family.

== Railroads ==
Near its beginning, the Pittsburgh Terminal Coal Company owned six collector railroads. The company operated the Coal Hill Coal Railroad, a 1.5-mile (2.4 km), 3 ft 4 in (1,016 mm) narrow gauge railroad until 1871, when it was sold to the Pittsburgh and Castle Shannon Railroad, which lengthened the line. The company assumed control of the Montour Railroad in 1901.

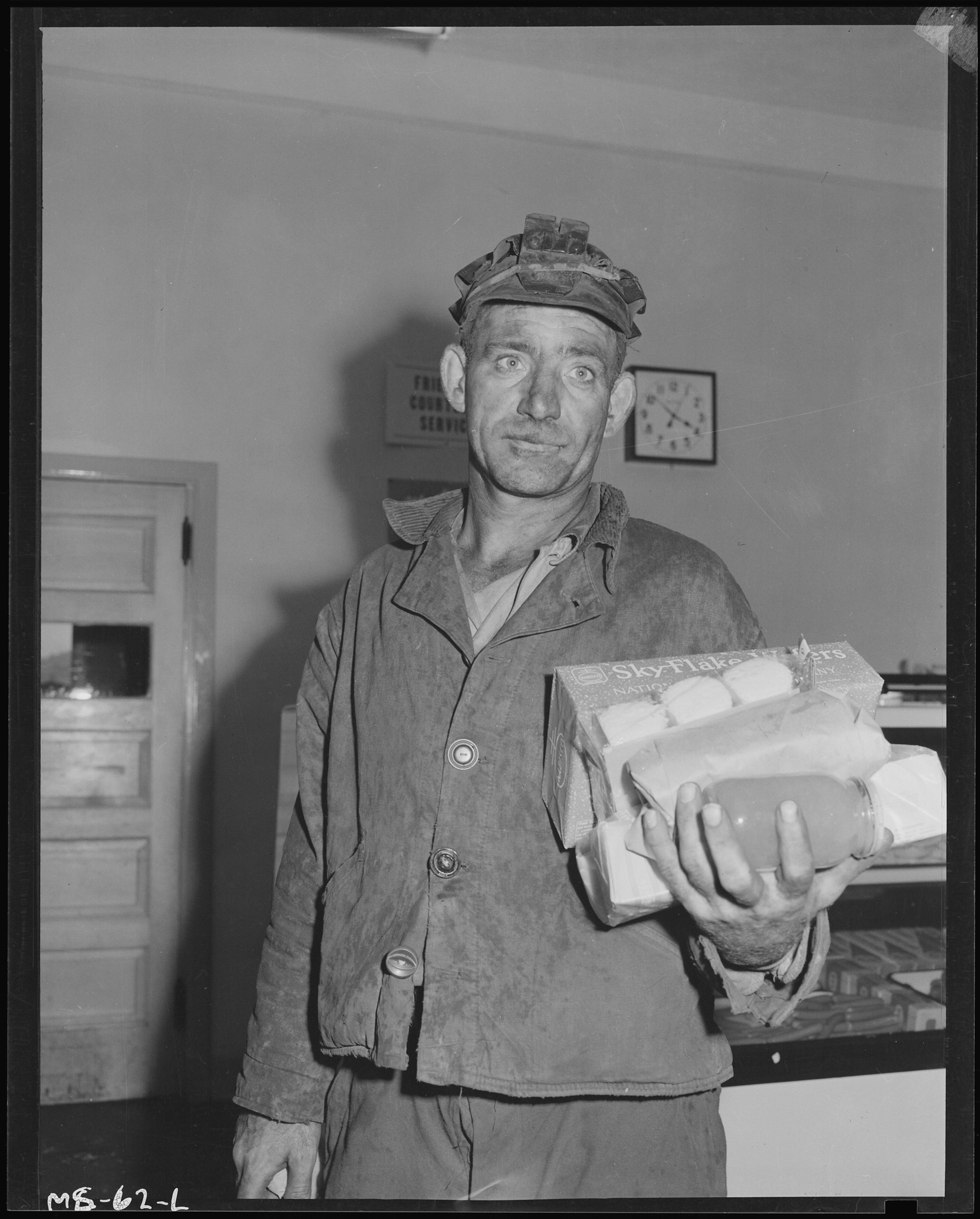
Coal miner Louis Shafer, Pittsburgh Coal Company (1946).

== Labor relations ==
Pittsburgh Terminal Coal paid compensation in the 1929 death of their union employee John Barcoski due to a beating by three officers of the Coal and Iron Police.

The company was involved in labor disputes with John L. Lewis and the United Mine Workers.

== See also ==
- Coal companies of the United States
- Coal mining in the United States
