= Pittsburgh and Castle Shannon Tunnel =

- Interactive map of Pittsburgh and Castle Shannon Tunnel

Overview
- Location: Pittsburgh, Pennsylvania
- Coordinates: 40.42811°N 80.00517°W
- Status: closed
- Start: above Carson Street
- End: above Warrington Avenue

Operation
- Work began: 1825, as a mine
- Constructed: conversion of former coal mine
- Opened: November 1, 1871
- Closed: 1912

Technical
- Length: 1,741 ft (531 m), 1,766 ft (538 m) with extension branch
- Track gauge: 3 ft 4 in (1,016 mm)
- Tunnel clearance: 12.5 ft (3.81 m)

The Pittsburgh and Castle Shannon Tunnel, also known as the Mount Washington Coal Tunnel, was a 3 ft 4 in (1,016 mm) narrow-gauge railway tunnel under Mt. Washington.

== History ==
This tunnel was originally begun as a coal mine in 1825 by Jacob Beltzhoover.

The mine was extended to the south side of Mount Washington by 1861, and used as part of a system to transport coal from mines along the Saw Mill Run valley to Pittsburgh, connecting with the 850 feet (260 m) Mt. Washington Coal Incline.

The lease to the tunnel was purchased by the Pittsburgh and Castle Shannon Railroad from Mrs. Mary Anne Bailey in November 1871, with the height of the tunnel being increased from 5.5 feet (1.7 m) to 12.5 feet (3.8 m) in 1874.

The tunnel provided passenger service, beginning in 1874, but this was terminated in 1880 when its passenger duties were assumed by the Castle Shannon Incline.

Although the tunnel was declared unsafe for passenger transport in 1893, the tunnel and the Horseshoe Curve continued to be used to transport coal until May 1, 1912.

The southern (Beltzhoover) end of the tunnel temporarily collapsed in a rainstorm in 1901.
