= Pittsburgh Railways =

Transport company in the United States

Pittsburgh Railways Company

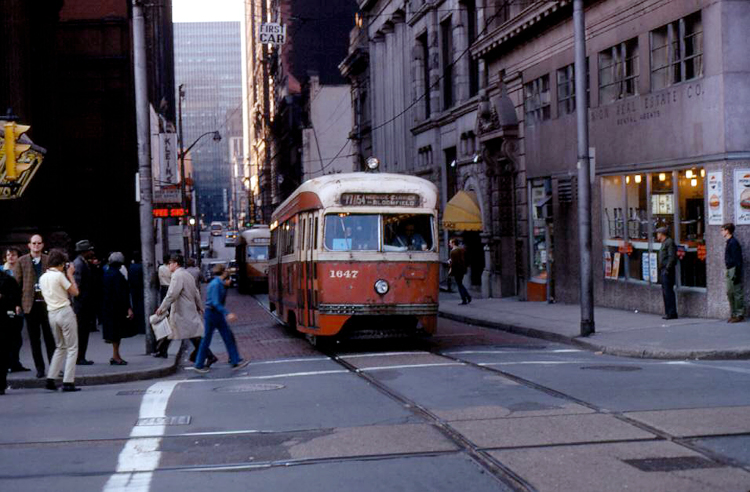
- PCC 1647 on a fantrip in Downtown Pittsburgh, signed for route 77/54

Overview
- Headquarters: Pittsburgh, Pennsylvania
- Locale: Allegheny County and Washington County, Pennsylvania
- Dates of operation: 1902–1964
- Predecessor: Pittsburgh and Castle Shannon Railroad; Consolidated Traction Company; Southern Traction Company; United Traction Company of Pittsburgh
- Successor: Port Authority of Allegheny County

Technical
- Track gauge: 5 ft 2 1/2 in (1,588 mm); Pennsylvania trolley gauge
- Length: 400 miles (640 km) in 1902; 606 miles (975 km) in 1918

The Pittsburgh Railways Company was a predecessor to Pittsburgh Regional Transit. At its peak, the system operated 666 PCC streetcars, the third-largest fleet in North America, after Toronto (745) and Chicago (683). The network comprised 68 streetcar routes, of which three remain in operation in partially modernized form as part of the Pittsburgh Light Rail system.

With the Port Authority's Transit Development Plan, many route names will be changed to its original, such as the 41D Brookline becoming the 39 Brookline. Many of the streetcar routes have been remembered in the route names of many Port Authority buses (e.g. 71 series).

== History ==
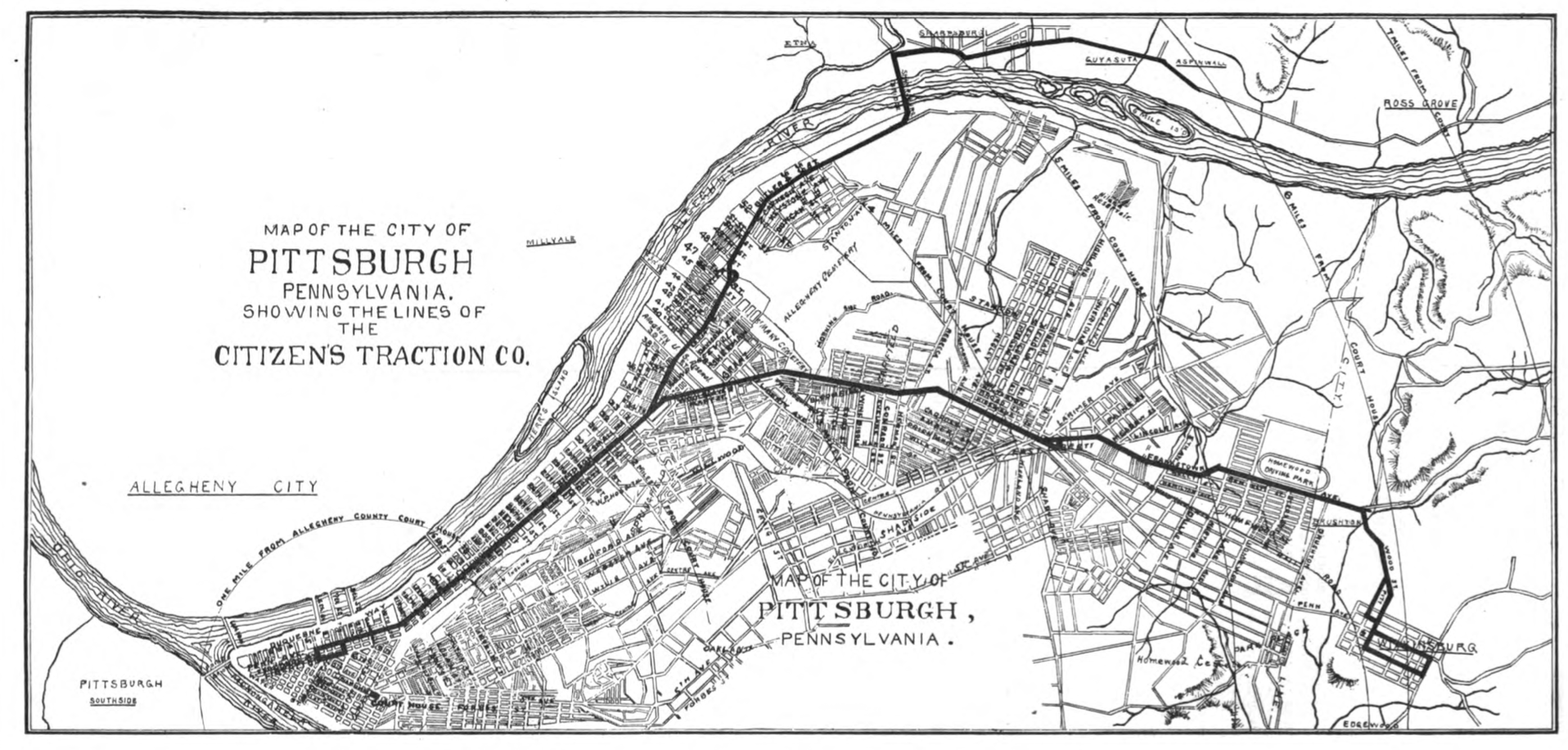
Pittsburgh Citizens Traction Company c. 1894

1895 to 1905 was a time of consolidation for the numerous street railways serving Pittsburgh. On July 24, 1895, the Consolidated Traction Company (CTC) was chartered and the following year acquired the Central Traction Company, Citizens Traction Company, Duquesne Traction Company and Pittsburgh Traction Company and converted them to electric operation. On July 27, 1896, the United Traction Company (UTC) was chartered and absorbed the Second Avenue Traction Company, which had been running electric cars since 1890.

The Southern Traction Company (STC) acquired the lease of the West End Traction Company on October 1, 1900. Pittsburgh Railway Company (PRC) was formed on January 1, 1902, when STC acquired operating rights over CTC and UTC. The new company operated 1,100 trolleys on 400 miles (640 km) of track, with 178.7 million passengers and revenues of $6.7 million on the year. PRC had over 20 car barns in the city as well as power stations. 1918 was the company's peak year, operating 99 trolley routes over 606 miles (975 km) of track.

The lease and operate business model proved hard to support and the company declared bankruptcy twice, first in 1918 lasting for 6 years and then again in 1938, this time lasting until January 1, 1951. Company costs rose in the early twentieth century. PRC faced constant pressure from the city to improve equipment and services. Workers walked out when a pay raise was rejected.

On July 26, 1936, PRC took delivery of PCC streetcar No. 100 from the St. Louis Car Company. It was placed in revenue service in August 1936, the first revenue earning PCC in the world.

Large scale abandonments of lines began in the late 1950s, usually associated with highway or bridge work.

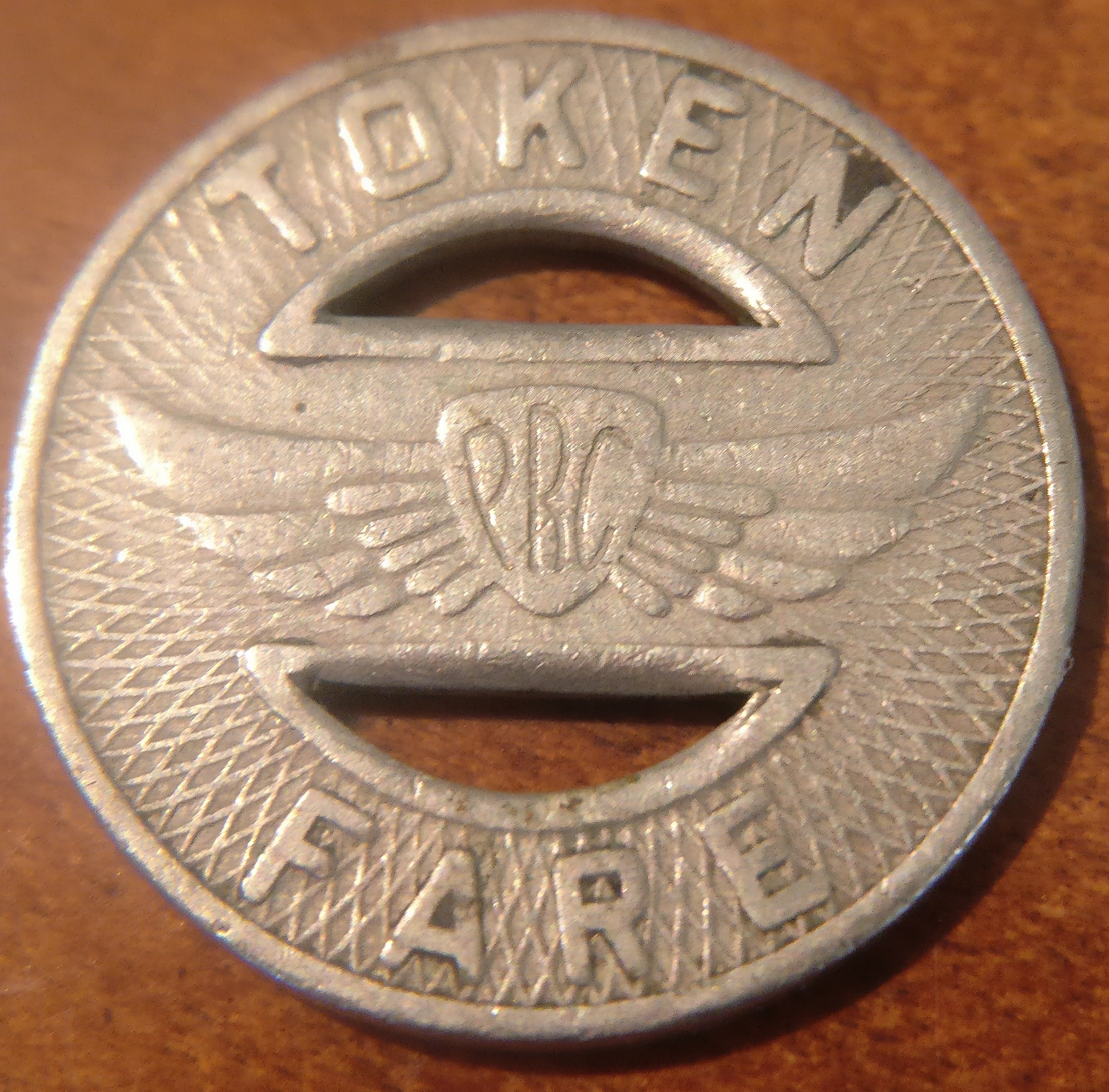
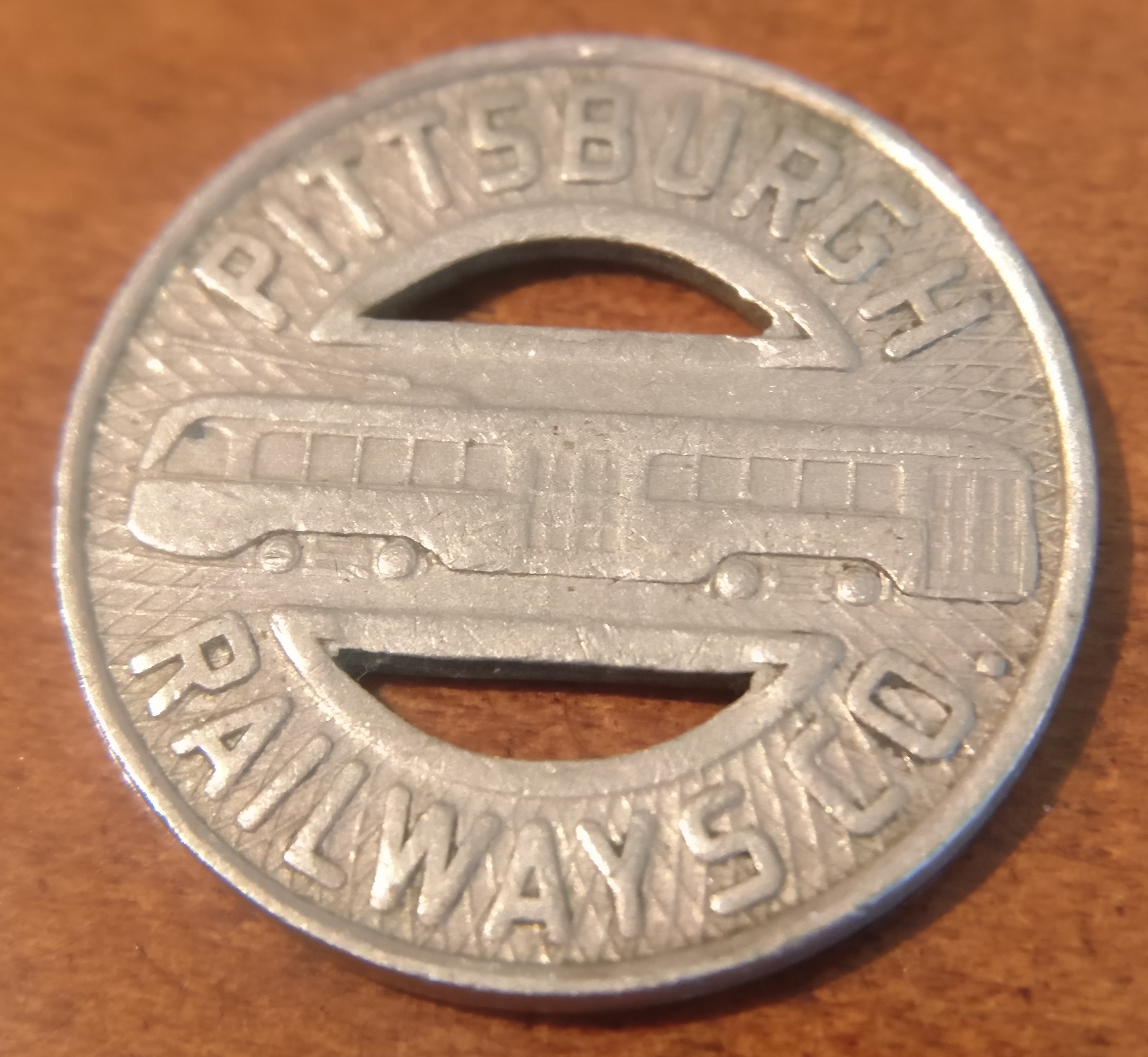
1930s Era Pittsburgh Railways Token Fare, rear (above) and front (below)

=== Duquesne-McKeesport ===
Highway improvements in the Duquesne-McKeesport area resulted in the replacement of trolley services with buses on September 21, 1958.

=== West End lines ===
The replacement of the Point Bridge with the Fort Pitt Bridge precipitated the abandonment of many routes to the West End, all on June 21, 1959. PRC was engaged in ongoing litigation over the failure of the Pennsylvania Public Utilities Commission to provide streetcar tracks on the new bridge. In the end the company was allowed to abandon 27 miles (43 km) of street track in situ and was awarded $300,000 as compensation. The litigation marked the beginning of significant abandonments: 90 percent of the network was dismantled over the next decade.

== Interurban ==
PRC Interurban Division ran an interurban trolley system linking Pittsburgh with towns in Washington County, such as Washington, Charleroi and Roscoe.

=== Charleroi ===
The origins of the Charleroi interurban line began in 1895 in Monongahela City, with the construction of a small street railway by the Monongahela City Street Railway Company. In 1900 the line was extended north to Riverview and in 1901 extended south to Black Diamond Mine. Here it turned inland, south along Black Dam Hollow (the former roadbed is now known as Trolley Lane). It met the northern end of the newly constructed (1899) Charleroi & West Side Street Railway at the now-disused Lock number 4 in North Charleroi.

The Charleroi interurban line was cut back to the Allegheny County border at Library (Simmons loop) in June 1953 It continued to operate until the 1980s as 35 Shannon-Library and became the southern portion of 47L Library via Overbrook when Light Rail Vehicles (LRVs) replaced trolleys. The trolley loop was removed in 2004. In 2010 this line became the Blue Line – Library, and in 2020 was renamed the Silver Line - Library.

=== Washington ===
The Washington line was cut back to the county boundary at Drake in August 1953 and eventually became the 36 Shannon-Drake. This in turn became the southern portion of 42 South Hills Village (excluding the new link from Dorchester to South Hills Village, which was built in 1984). The final portion of the interurban from Dorchester to Drake was renamed 47 Drake, finally closing in 1999 and bringing to an end PCC Streetcar operation in Pittsburgh.

== Diversification ==
The company acquired G. Barr & Co., a manufacturer of aerosol cans, in 1962, and bought Alarm Device Manufacturing Company (Ademco) in 1963. It received $16.558 million for the sale of the streetcar system to the Port Authority in 1964. In 1967, it was renamed to Pittway Corporation. Later, Pittway became best known as a manufacturer and distributor of professional fire and burglar alarms and other security systems. On February 3, 2000, Pittway was acquired by Honeywell.

== Rolling stock ==
=== Early types ===
Double deck cars were used by PRC between 1913 and 1924, a rarity for such cars in the U.S. Conventional single-deck stock formed the majority of the fleet.

=== PCC types ===
PRC operated 666 PCCs on 68 routes; the second-largest fleet of new cars (after Chicago), starting with number 100, the first PCC to enter revenue service. The company took delivery of car 1600 in 1945, which was the prototype for the over 1,800 post-War “all-electric” PCCs built in North America. Cars 1700–1724, which were delivered in 1948, were equipped with special features for use on the interurban lines to Washington and Charleroi. These included B-3 trucks and a roof-mounted sealed-beam headlight. (Cars 1615–19 and 1644–48 were similarly modified in 1948.)

Number	Order Date	Builder & Order Nº	Price (ea.)	Notes
100	Apr 6, 1936	St. Louis Car 1603		first PCC to enter revenue service
1000–1099	Jul 18, 1936	St. Louis Car 1604	$15,715	
1100–1199	Apr 1, 1937	St. Louis Car 1610	$16,000	
1200–1299	Oct 16, 1937	St. Louis Car 1620	$15,900	1230 & 1278 equipped with B-3 trucks
1400–1499	May 27, 1941	St. Louis Car 1633	$17,034	
1500–1564	Jun 16, 1942	St. Louis Car 1639	$19,000	1547 St. Louis Car order no. 1646
1600–1699	Jan 14, 1944	St. Louis Car 1646	$20,000	1600 was All-Electric prototype; destroyed May 18, 1955 1601-1699 Air-Electrics Some given B-3 trucks in the late 40's for interurban service 1630 equipped with ceiling fans & monitor roof; some rebuilt and renumbered into the 1700-series
1700–1799	Sep 22, 1947	St. Louis Car 1669	$28,350	1700–1724 B-3 trucks; 1725-1799 B-2B trucks
4000–4013	1981	Port Authority Transit	c. $100,000	

In 1950 the 100 was converted to instruction car M-11. Because replacement parts were no longer available, cars 1784 (originally 1603, and subsequently renumbered 1976) and 1779 were rebuilt in 1976 and 1977 respectively, with LRV-style flat fronts. In 1981 PATransit constructed cars 4000–4013 on new frames that utilized a mix of new parts and components salvaged from retired 1700-series cars. The last four PCCs were finally retired on September 4, 1999, having been replaced by Siemens SD-400 Light Rail Vehicles.

New Nº	Original	New Nº	Original	New Nº	Original
4000	1702	4005	1719	4010	1757
4001	1720	4006	1767	4011	1733
4002	1740	4007	1729	4012	4000
4003	1731	4008	1709	4013	1762
4004	1739	4009	1700		

=== Preservation ===
A number of Pittsburgh streetcars have been preserved.

Nº	Type	Built by	Year	Preserved at	Notes
1138	PCC	St. Louis Car Company	1936	Pennsylvania Trolley Museum	
1440	PCC	St. Louis Car Company	1942	Seashore Trolley Museum	
1467	PCC	St. Louis Car Company	1941	Pennsylvania Trolley Museum	
1644	PCC	St. Louis Car Company	1945	Northern Ohio Railway Museum	
1705	PCC	St. Louis Car Company	1948	Midwest Electric Railway	sold Feb 2018 to Donald Kirk (for restoration and operation at a new McCloud (CA) Transportation Park project)
1711	PCC	St. Louis Car Company	1948	Pennsylvania Trolley Museum	Operable
1724	PCC	St. Louis Car Company	1948	Heinz History Center	
1799	PCC	St. Louis Car Company	1945	Pennsylvania Trolley Museum	Built as 1613. Renumbered 1799 when overhauled in 1979.
3487	Conventional	St. Louis Car Company	1905	Pennsylvania Trolley Museum	Converted to wreck car M132 in 1934. Converted back to passenger configuration in 1956.
3756	Conventional	Osgood Bradley Car Company	1925	Pennsylvania Trolley Museum	Operable
4001	PCC	PATransit	1981	South Hills Village Rail Center	Static display.
4002	PCC	PATransit	1981	Colorado Springs	Undergoing restoration at the Pikes Peak Trolley Museum.
4004	PCC	PATransit	1981	Pennsylvania Trolley Museum	Operable
4006	PCC	PATransit	1981	Cleveland, Ohio	Last seen in 2016 at the west end of the Detroit–Superior Bridge labeled "Buckeye Trolley".
4007	PCC	PATransit	1981	Bethel Park, Pennsylvania	Static exhibit with numbers removed.
4008	PCC	PATransit	1981	San Francisco Municipal Railway	Acquired for the F Market & Wharves line.
4009	PCC	PATransit	1981	San Francisco Municipal Railway	Acquired for the F Market & Wharves line.
4011	PCC	PATransit	1981	Buckeye Lake, Ohio	Privately owned (derelict).
4012	PCC	PATransit	1981	Buckeye Lake, Ohio	Privately owned (derelict); originally numbered 4000.
4140	Conventional	Pressed Steel Car Company	1911	Pennsylvania Trolley Museum	Built in McKees Rocks. Converted to snow plow M200 in 1940, then tow car in 1955.
4145	Conventional	Pressed Steel Car Company	1911	Pennsylvania Trolley Museum	Built in McKees Rocks.
4398	Conventional	St. Louis Car Company	1914	Pennsylvania Trolley Museum	Restored 1970's to 2012; operable
M1	Pay car	Pullman Car Company	1890	Pennsylvania Trolley Museum	Originally built as an 8-wheel car for the Pittsburgh, Allegheny & Manchester Street railway, it was underpowered for Pittsburgh's hills and was converted to a 4-wheel pay car in the 1890s. Pittsburgh Railways assigned it the number M1.
M37	Snow sweeper	McGuire-Cummings Manufacturing Company	1896	Pennsylvania Trolley Museum	Built as Consolidated Traction Company number 9. Renumbered M37 by Pittsburgh Railways.
M56	Snow sweeper		1918	Pennsylvania Trolley Museum	Built for the Philadelphia Company and assigned to Beaver Valley traction line as number 1. Transferred to Pittsburgh Railways in 1935 and renumbered M56.
M210	Line car	Pittsburgh Railways Company	1940	Pennsylvania Trolley Museum	Built in Homewood shops using components salvaged from two other cars.
M283	Crane car	Differential Car Company	1929	Pennsylvania Trolley Museum	Operable
M551	Side-Dump car	Differential Car Company	1922	Pennsylvania Trolley Museum	Operable

== Routes ==
Pittsburgh Railways operated 68 streetcar routes.

A notable, unnumbered, tripper (unscheduled extra) service was signed Stadium-Forbes Field, for Pitt Panthers and Pittsburgh Steelers football games and Pirates baseball games. Pitt Stadium and Forbes Field were convenient to the lines on Fifth Avenue and Forbes Avenue, both two-way streets during the trolley era. This service, which probably last ran in fall 1966, was no longer possible after the East End lines closed in January 1967.

The Interurban lines did not use route numbers. Outbound interurban cars were signed for their outbound destination, namely Charleroi, Roscoe or Washington; some PCC rollsigns instead prefixed Shannon- to the destination, e.g. Shannon-Washington. Inbound cars were signed simply Pittsburgh.

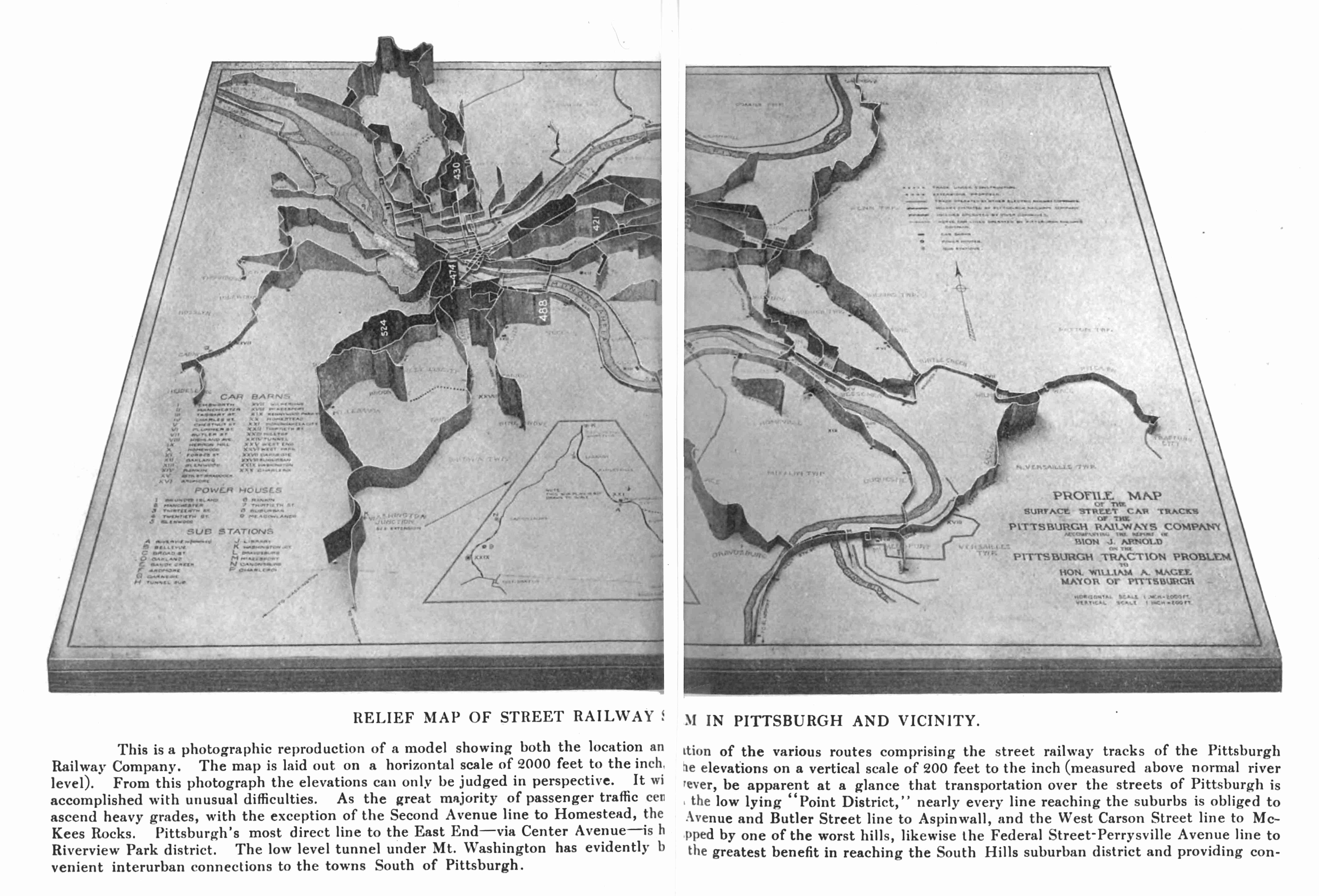
Map showing gradients in 1910

== Car barns ==
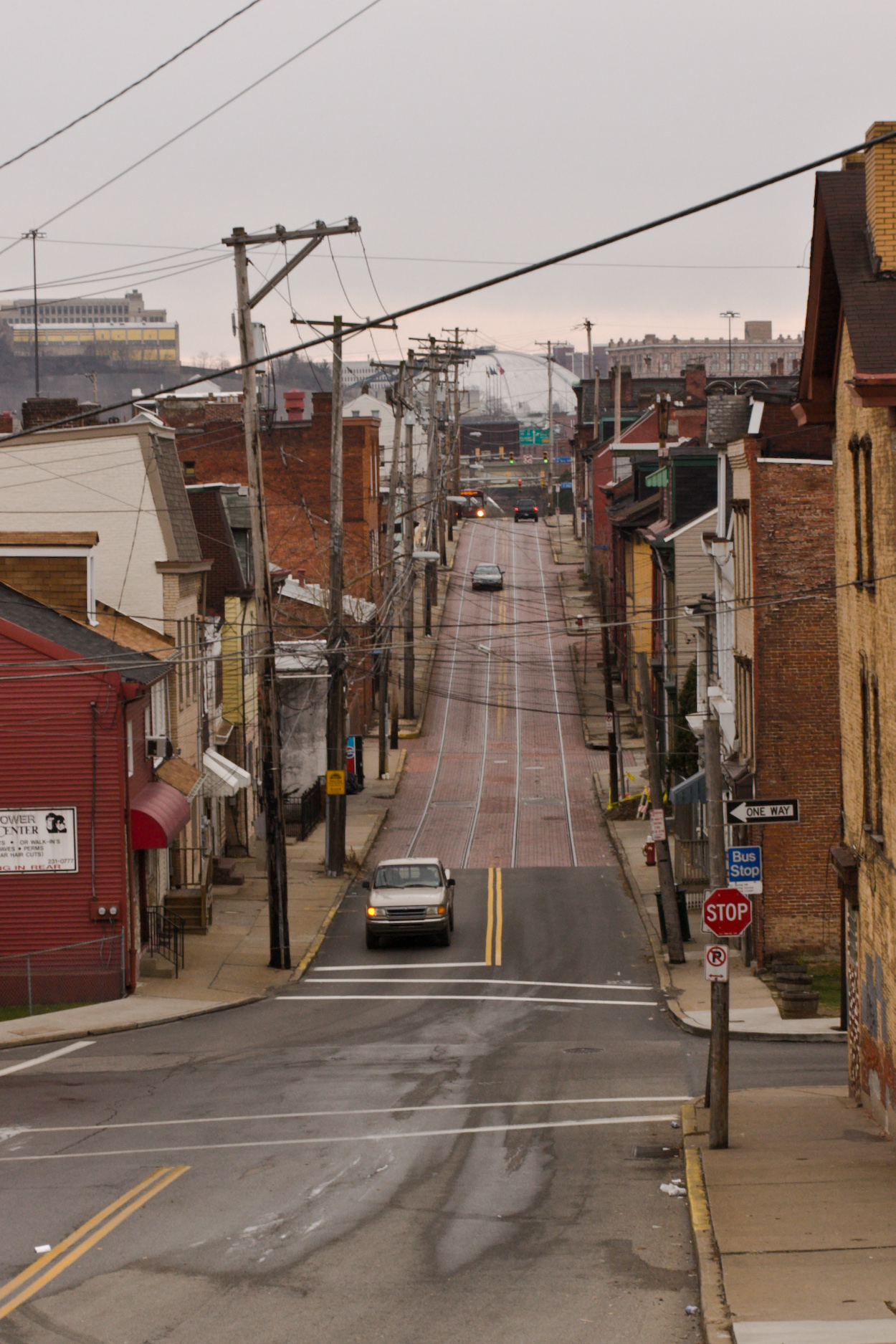
Track remains in-situ in this 2008 photo of Chestnut Street in East Allegheny, where 1 – Spring Garden and 5 – Spring Hill once ran.

Pittsburgh Railways inherited many different car barns from the companies that formed it, many of which were closed during the final years prior to take over by the Port Authority. At the time of the PA takeover on February 28, 1964, only Craft Avenue, Keating and Tunnel (South Hills) remained as streetcar facilities, together with Homewood Shops, and a former carbarn in Rankin used only for dead storage of retired cars.

=== Craft Avenue ===
A large (16 track) facility with several administration buildings at Craft Avenue and Forbes Avenue in Oakland. It served routes 50, 64, 66, 67, 68, 69, 75 and 81. Craft Avenue assumed storage duties for East End facilities that were closed such as Homewood, Herron Hill and Highland Park, as well as Carrick on the South Side; thus it eventually also served routes such as 22, 71, 73, 76, 77/54, 87 and 88. Craft Avenue ceased to be a streetcar facility on January 28, 1967 when all East End lines were converted to bus. The site is now occupied by the Magee-Womens Hospital of the University of Pittsburgh Medical Center.

=== Glenwood ===
Glenwood Car Barn served the 55, 56, 57, 58, 65 and 98 routes and housed approximately 54 cars.

=== Homewood ===
Homewood car barn was begun in 1900 and grew to be one of the two largest installations of Pittsburgh Railways, with 110 cars housed there. Also the site of PRC's heavy repair shops, it covered four blocks from 7100 to 7400 on the south side of Frankstown Avenue, bordered by North Lang Avenue to the west, Felicia Way to the south and Braddock to the east. On May 18, 1955 Barn No. 2 was destroyed by fire along with all of the equipment within it, which included PCC trolleys 1026, 1051, 1155, 1220, 1281, 1294,1600,1648, 1682,1701,1725. Homewood car barn closed in 1960, though the shops remained in use until January 1967 when all East End lines were closed. The large site is now used for a mixture of residential and commercial premises, with the last remaining railway buildings converted first to a skating rink and then in 1997 to a bowling alley and entertainment venue called the Homewood Coliseum. Since 2000 the complex has also housed The Trolley Station Oral History Center.

=== Ingram ===
Ingram carbarn was the main storage facility in the West End. Located on Berry Street in Ingram Borough on routes 30 and 31, it also served routes 23, 25, 26, 27, 28, 29 and 34. It consisted of a 4-track brick shed housing 20 cars, an 8-track open yard capable of holding about 120 cars, and a brick administration building. Ingram ceased as an active facility after June 21, 1959 when all the West End lines were abandoned after the Point Bridge was closed to traffic, although 30 1000- and 1100-series PCCs made surplus by the conversion were scrapped there. The property was sold to the Roman Catholic Diocese of Pittsburgh; the barn proper was converted in 1968 to the Church of the Ascension, while the yard office was converted to classrooms, parish offices and a parish hall.

=== Keating ===
Keating car house was built in 1921. It served routes 7, 8, 9, 10, 11, 12, 15 and 21. The remaining trolley routes from Manchester car house (6, 13, 14, 18 and 19) were moved to Keating in 1959. The final North Side trolleys (6/14 and 21) were transferred to South Hills Car House in 1965 and the facility became the bus-only Ross Garage.

=== Millvale ===
Millvale car barn was built on the site of the Graff, Bennett Mill which burnt down in 1900. It catered for services 1, 2, 3, 4 and 5.

=== Plummer Street ===
The car barn at 48th and Plummer Street in Lawrenceville served the 94 Aspinwall, 95 Butler Street, and 96 East Liberty via Morningside services. It replaced the Butler Street Cable and Horse car barn at 47th and Butler. It was closed in the summer of 1954, with services 94 Aspinwall and 95 Butler Street routes being assigned to Manchester Car House until June 1959. They then transferred to Keating Car House until replaced by bus routes on November 13, 1960. Service 96 East Liberty was transferred first to Bunker Hill car barn then Homewood Car House until June, 1960. It was then transferred to Craft Avenue car house, also being replaced by buses on November 13, 1960 when the 62nd St. Sharpsburg Bridge was closed.

=== Tunnel ===
The Tunnel (also referred to as South Hills) car barn, located along Curtis and Jasper Streets next to South Hills Junction and the south portal of the South Hills Tunnel, was the car storage facility for many, and eventually all, South Side lines, and one of the most important such facilities on the entire system. It consisted of a 4-track brick shed with administrative offices, plus a 6-track outdoor yard. While containing fewer tracks than yards like Craft Avenue, the length of the tracks allowed storage of many more cars per road, especially outdoors. Tunnel served lines 23, 35, 36, 37, 38, 39, 40, 42 and 43 (later the 42/38), 44, 46 (later 49), 48, and later the 47 and 53 lines to Carrick, and the final North Side lines 6/14 and 21. It also shared storage duties for the two Interurban lines with the barns in Charleroi and in Tylerdale (Washington). As the nucleus of the surviving lines, Tunnel barn survived into the mid-1980s, when it was demolished after being replaced by the modern storage and maintenance facility at the end of the South Hills Village line.

=== West Park ===
The West Park car barn in McKees Rocks was a large facility with two barns and several outdoor sidings. It was bounded by Third Street to the north, Chartiers Avenue to the south and Rox Street to the east. It closed in 1931, but remained a storage facility for scrap trolley parts. The building was demolished in 1951. 5 Generation Bakers now occupies the southern part of the site with a bakery and a retail outlet in a former supermarket building, with new housing to the north.

== Gallery ==
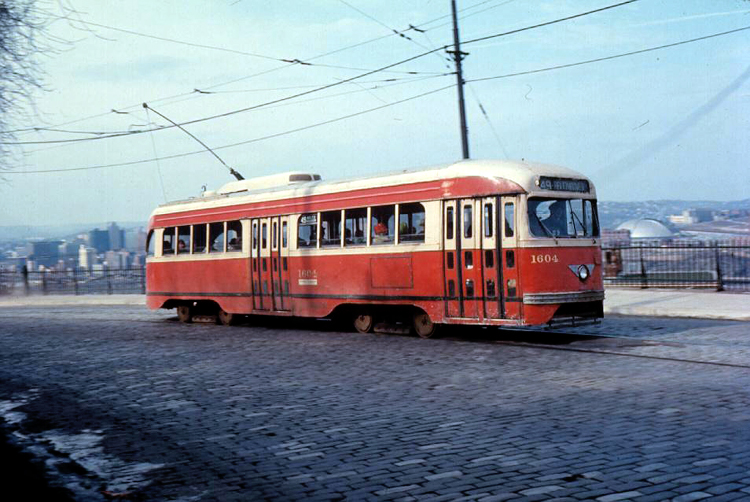
PCC 1604, route "49 – Beltzhoover"

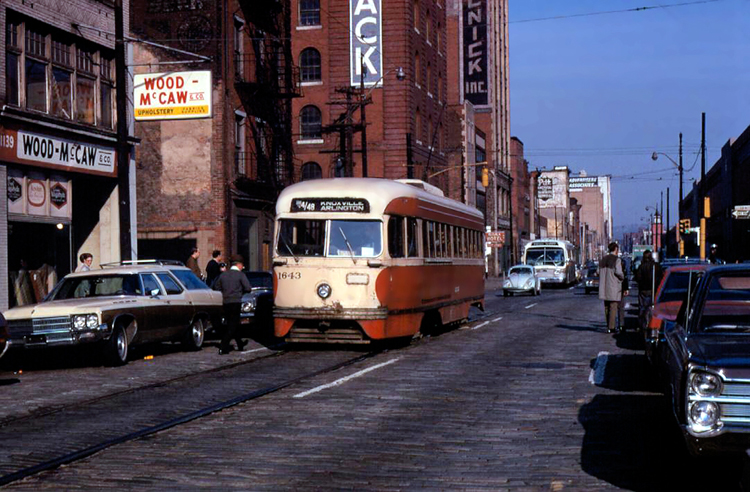
PCC 1643, route 44/48

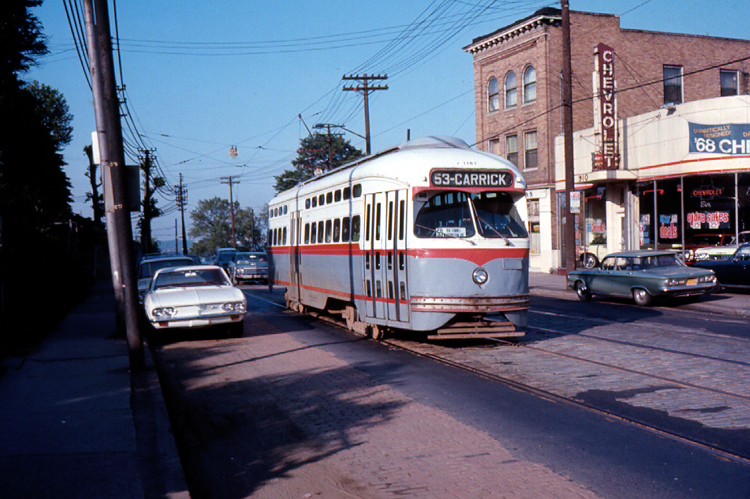
PCC on route "53 – Carrick"

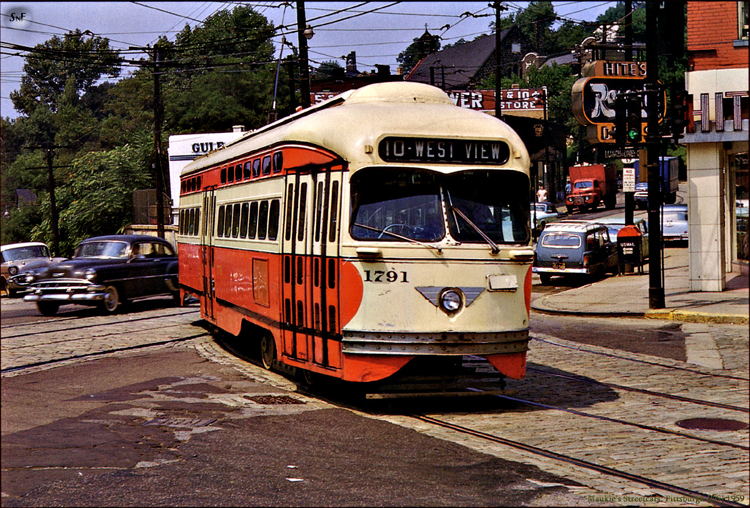
PCC 1791, route "10 West View

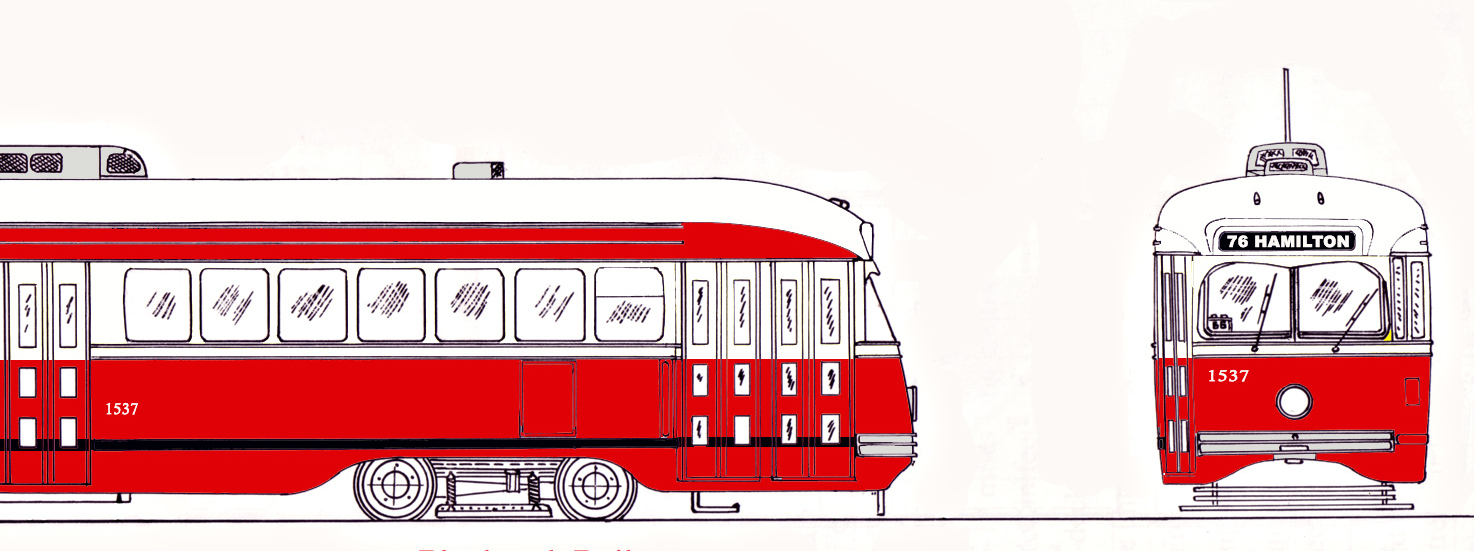
PCC color scheme in Pittsburgh

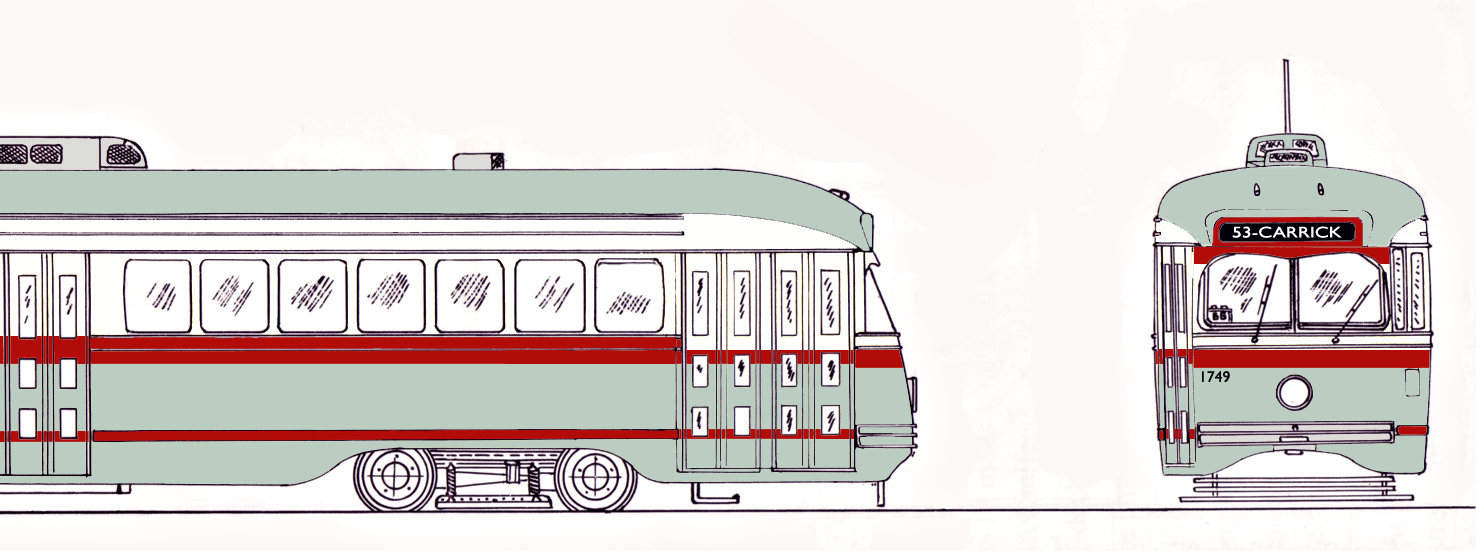
Later PCC color scheme for Pittsburgh Port Authority Transit

== See also ==
- Pittsburgh Light Rail - modern successor to the streetcar system
- West Penn Railways - connecting interurban system to the southeast
