= Patrick Bernard Delany =

Irish-American engineer and inventor

- Born: January 28, 1845; King's County, Ireland (now County Offaly)
- Died: October 19, 1924 (aged 79); South Orange, New Jersey, U.S.
- Resting place: Nantucket, Massachusetts
- Occupation: Engineer
- Spouse: Annie Ovenshine (m. 1869)
- Children: 1
- Awards: Elliott Cresson Medal (1886, 1896); John Scott Medal (1886)
- Engineering career
- Discipline: Electrical engineering
- Significant advance: Electrical telegraph

Patrick Bernard Delany (28 January 1845 – 19 October 1924) was an Irish-American engineer and inventor. Newspaper feature coverage in 1909 called him "the world's greatest telegraph expert and inventor."

== Biography ==
He was born in King's County, Ireland (now Offaly). He came to the U.S. at the age of 10 and learned telegraphy in Hartford, Connecticut. Gradually he worked up from office boy to be superintendent of lines. In 1872 he and Thomas Edison worked together as engineers for the Automatic Telegraph Company.

His first patent, related to telegraph relays, was granted in 1873. In 1877 Delaney left the industry entirely, to work as a newspaper correspondent, editor, and writer, until the discovery in 1880 that his patent could be used as an alternative technology to challenge the Western Union Telegraph Company's monopoly on telegraph relays. Delaney's later inventions included more than 150 patents registered in the U.S. through 1922. Almost all relate to telegraphy in some way: they cover anti-induction cables which were "extensively manufactured at Pittsburg, Penn" as of 1895, synchronous multiplex telegraphy to send six messages simultaneously over one wire, and rapid-machine telegraphy for land lines. His automatic telegraph system was capable of transmitting and recording 3000 words a minute over a single wire. In the 1890s he was experimenting at the Heart's Content Cable Station in Newfoundland and Labrador to improve the through-put of the transatlantic telegraph cable.

Delany was awarded gold medals at the International Inventions Exhibition in London (1885), at the Pan-American Exposition (1901), and at the St. Louis Exposition (1904), and the John Scott Medal of the Franklin Institute. Delany was a two-time recipient of the Elliott Cresson Medal awarded by the Franklin Institute, one in 1886 for "Synchronous Telegraphy" and another in 1896 for "Telegraphy, High speed system". A copy of Delany's Telegraph Relay is in the permanent collection of the National Museum of American History of the Smithsonian Institution.

From 1893 to 1895 he was a vice president of the American Institute of Electrical Engineers.
