= Giessbachbahn =

Historic funicular at Lake Brienz, Switzerland

Coordinates: 46.7349°N 8.0225°E

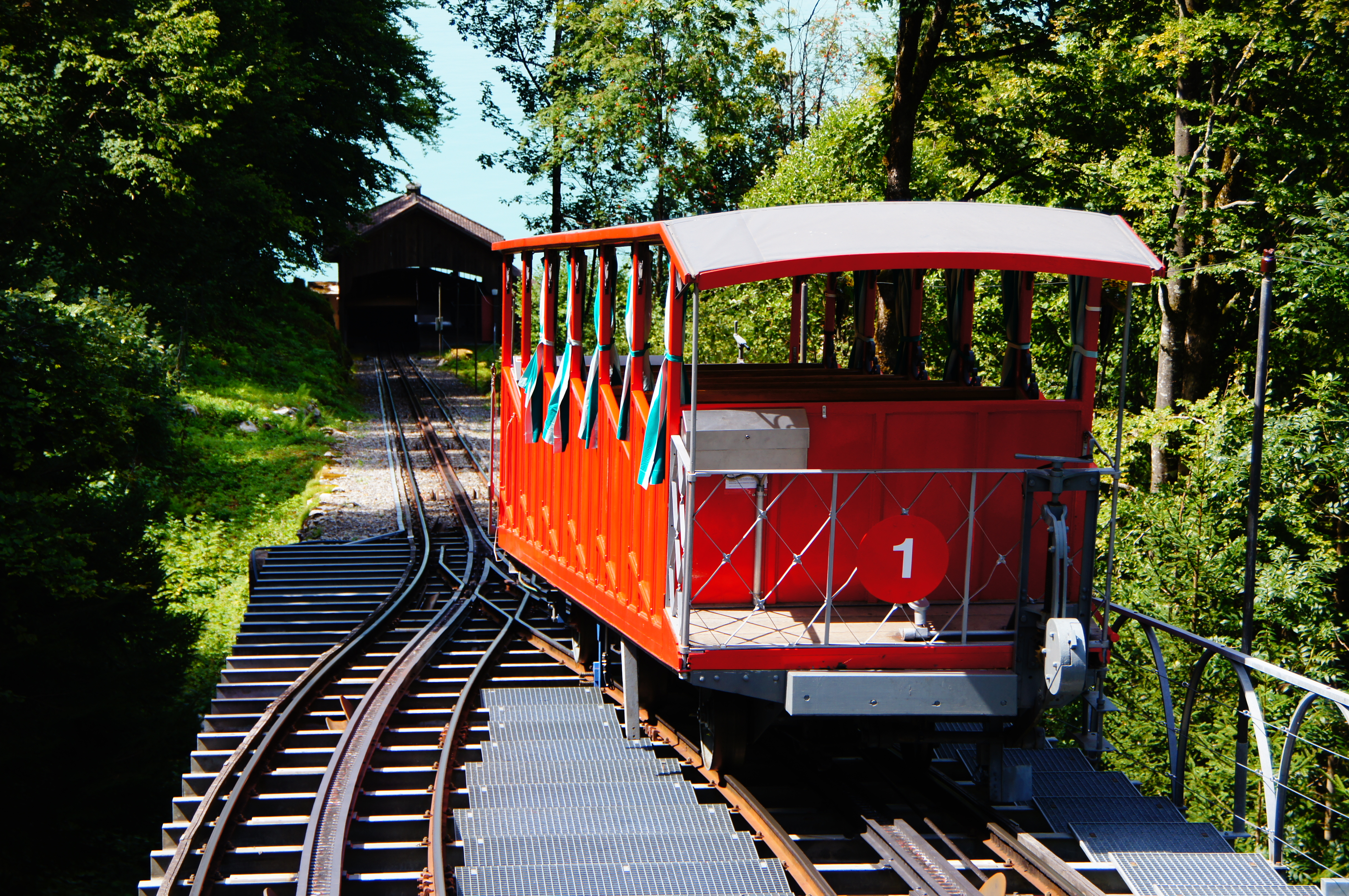
- Looking downwards, with car and passing loop (2012)

Overview
- Other name: Drahtseilbahn Giessbach
- Status: In operation
- Locale: Canton of Bern, Switzerland
- Termini: "Giessbach See (Talstation)"; "Giessbach Hotel"
- Stations: 2
- Website: giessbach.ch

Service
- Type: Funicular
- Route number: 2470
- Rolling stock: 2 for 40 passengers each

History
- Opened: 21 July 1879 (146 years ago)
- New Abt switch: 1891

Technical
- Track length: 363 metres (1,191 ft)
- Number of tracks: 1 with passing loop
- Rack system: Riggenbach
- Track gauge: 1,000 mm (3 ft 3 3/8 in)
- Electrification: 1948 (water counterbalancing 1879-1912, Pelton wheel)
- Highest elevation: 656 m (2,152 ft)
- Maximum incline: 32%

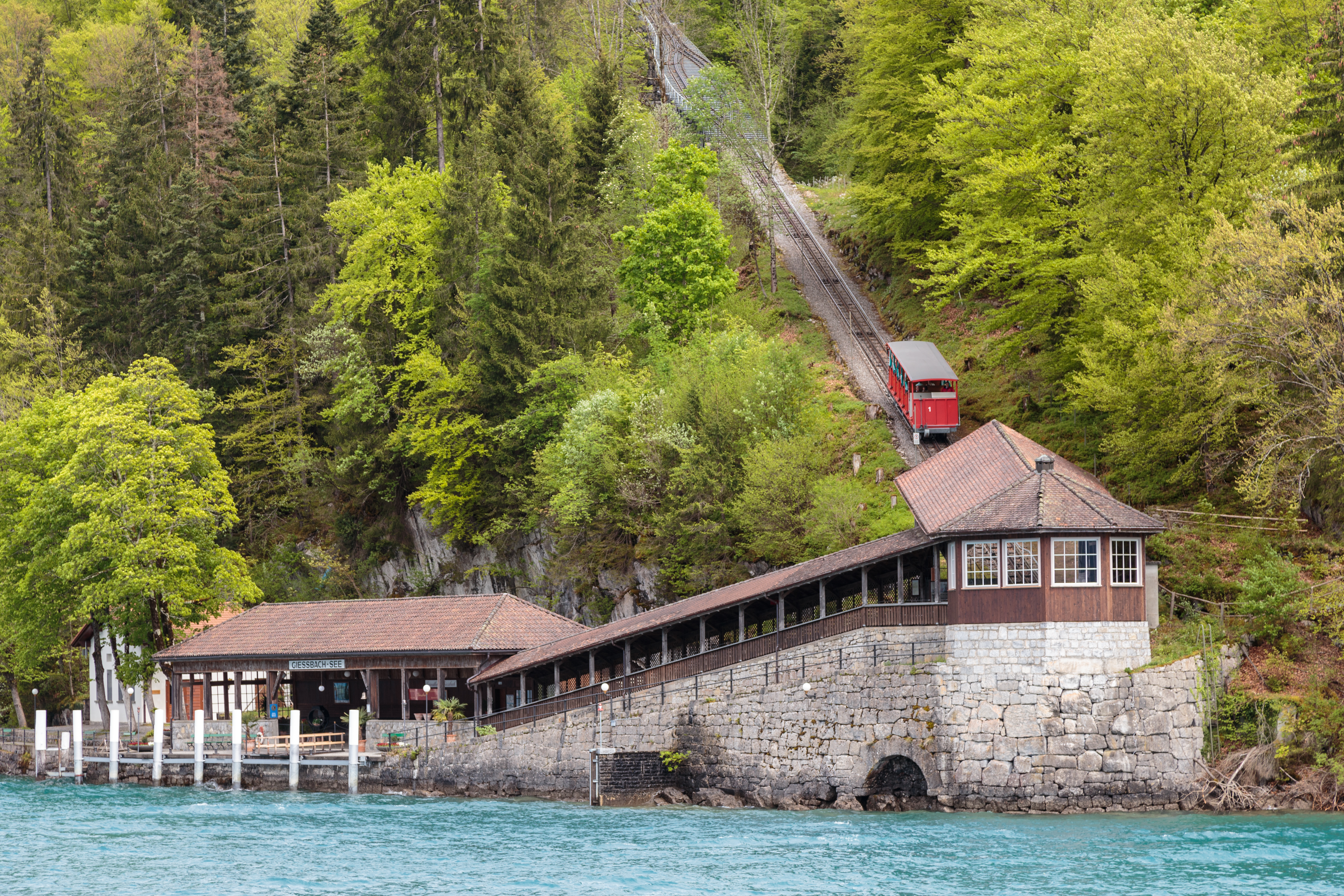
Giessbach Lake boat landing stage and the Griessbachbahn (funicular railway) valley station

The Giessbach Funicular (German: Giessbachbahn) is a historic funicular in the Swiss canton of Bern and municipality of Brienz. It links a landing stage on Lake Brienz, served by ferry services on the lake, to the Grand Hotel Giessbach and Giessbach Falls above. The funicular is owned by the hotel, but since 1983 has been operated by a preservation foundation.

== Description ==
The Giessbach funicular was designed by the Swiss engineer Carl Roman Abt. When it was opened in 1879, it was the first funicular with a two-rail single track layout with a relatively short passing loop in the middle. Its turnouts had no moving parts, which was a remarkable achievement for the time. Abt later developed a modification of this design which became known as the Abt Switch.

Originally the funicular was powered by water ballast, and the Riggenbach rack rail in the middle of the track was used for speed control. In 1912 the water ballast system was replaced by a hydraulic engine powered by a Pelton turbine. Which is in its own turn was replaced in 1948 by an electric drive. The rack rail is currently used for emergency braking. The funicular's two wooden cars are restored back to their original appearance in 1879.

In 2015 the funicular was included in the list of Historic Mechanical Engineering Landmarks by the American Society of Mechanical Engineers under number 259.

== Characteristics ==
The main characteristics of system are:

Feature	Value
Number of cars	2
Number of stops	2
Configuration	Single track with passing loop
Track length	363 metres (1,191 ft)
Rise	98 metres (322 ft)
Maximum gradient	32%
Track gauge	1,000 mm (3 ft 3 3/8 in)
Speed	1.9 metres per second (6.2 ft/s)
Journey time	4 mins
Capacity	40 passengers per car; 480 persons in each direction per hour

== See also ==
- List of funicular railways
- List of funiculars in Switzerland
- List of heritage railways and funiculars in Switzerland
