= John Scott Medal =

John Scott Award
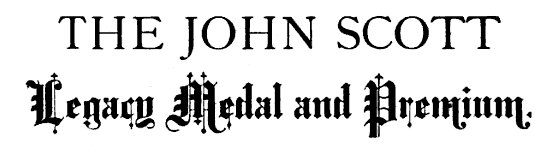
- Country: USA
- Presented by: The Franklin Institute and the City Council of Philadelphia
- First award: 1816
- Website: https://thejohnscottaward.org/index.html

John Scott Award, created in 1816 as the John Scott Legacy Medal and Premium, is presented to people whose inventions are deemed to have improved the "comfort, welfare, and happiness of human kind" in a significant way. Since 1919 the Board of Directors of City Trusts of Philadelphia provide this award, recommended by an advisory committee.

== History ==
In 1822 the first awards were given to thirteen people by the Philadelphia Society for Promoting Agriculture entrusted by the "Corporation of the city of Philadelphia".

The druggist John Scott of Edinburgh organized a $4,000 fund which, after his death in 1815 was administered by a merchant until the first award, a copper medal and "an amount not to exceed twenty dollars", was given in 1822. (At the time, $20 could buy one ox or a 12-volume encyclopedia.) Several hundred recipients have since been selected by the City Council of Philadelphia, which decides from the annual list of nominees made by the Franklin Institute.

== Notable recipients ==
Most awards have been given for inventions in science and medicine. Notable recipients include:

- Luis W. Alvarez
- Frederick G. Banting
- John Bardeen
- James Black
- William T. Bovie
- Ralph L. Brinster
- Marie Curie
- William Duane
- Thomas Edison
- Alexander Fleming
- Peter Koch
- Irving Langmuir
- Edwin Land
- Christian J. Lambertsen
- Luther D. Lovekin
- Benoît Mandelbrot
- Guglielmo Marconi
- Edgar Sharp McFadden
- Humberto Fernandez Moran
- Kary B. Mullis
- Jonas Salk
- Glenn Seaborg
- Richard E. Smalley
- Nikola Tesla
- Wright brothers
- Robert Burns Woodward
- David Gestetner

== Recent winners ==
Year	Winner	Area of Innovation
2026	Magid Abou-Gharbia	medicinal chemistry and drug discovery
2026	Nina G. Jablonski	impacts of UV radiation on human skin evolution
2026	Daniel M. Skovronsky	imaging agents for Alzheimer's Disease
2025	Bonnie Lynn Bassler	quorum sensing in bacteria
2025	Robert Prud’homme	flash nanoprecipitation manufacturing of nanoparticles
2025	David Fajgenbaum	drug repurposing for treatment of rare diseases
2024	R. Vijay Kumar	cooperative and multi-agent robotics
2024	Takeo Kanade	computer vision and robotics
2024	Daniela Rus	distributed, networked autonomous robotic systems
2023	Michael E. Mann	scientific understanding of historic climate change
2023	Robert H. Socolow	pioneering new concepts and creating new fields in energy and the environment
2022	Gary Beauchamp	translational research on taste, smell, and flavor
2022	Nancy Bonini	use of Drosophila to gain insight into degenerative diseases of the brain
2022	Barry Arkles	Silicon-based science for medical devices and polymeric materials
2021	Katalin Kariko	stable mRNA enabling gene-induced immune response
2021	Drew Weissman	mRNA approach to enable-induced response within the human body
2020	Jean Bennett	Gene therapies for curing retinal degeneration
2020	William DeGrado	development of antimicrobial peptides
2020	Michael Klein	algorithms for computational simulation of biological systems
2019	Emily A. Carter	reverse combustion
2019	Charles L. Kane	topological insulators
2019	Eugene Mele	topological insulators
2018	James West	foil electret microphone
2018	Bjarne Stroustrup	c++ computer programming language
2017	Ruzena Bajcsy	robotics and engineering science
2017	Warren Ewens	population genetics research
2017	Masatoshi Nei	evolutionary theory
2016	Emmanuelle Charpentier	CRISPR-Cas genome editing
2016	Jennifer Doudna	CRISPR-Cas genome editing
2016	Feng Zhang	CRISPR-Cas genome editing
2016	Carl H. June	cancer immunology
2015	Madeleine M. Joullié	synthetic chemistry
2015	John P. Perdew	density functional theory
2014	Susan Band Horwitz	cancer therapeutics
2014	Leonard Hayflick	discovery of cellular senescence and innovations in microscopy
2014	Paul S. Moorhead	discovery of cellular senescence and innovations in microscopy
2013	P. Leslie Dutton	redox reactions in biochemistry
2013	N. Scott Adzick	fetal surgery
2013	Robert L. Brent	environmental causes of birth defects
2012	Paul J. Steinhardt	quasicrystals
2012	John Q. Trojanowski	neurodegenerative diseases
2012	Virginia Man-Yee Lee	neurodegenerative diseases
2011	David E. Kuhl	PET scans
2011	Jenny Pickworth Glusker	crystallography
2010	Christian J. Lambertsen	underwater diving equipment
2010	William A. Eaton	protein aggregation and folding

== See also ==
- Carl Roman Abt, A past recipient (1889)
