= Reginald J. S. Pigott =

British/American mechanical and consulting engineer

Reginald James Seymour Pigott (February 4, 1886 – December 23, 1966) was a British/American mechanical and consulting engineer; director of the engineering division of Gulf Research & Development Company, a subsidiary of Gulf Oil; and inventor.

Pigott was known for his work in the fields of fluid flow pumps and power plant design. He served as president of three national engineering societies, then a unique accomplishment. He was president of the American Society for Measurement and Control founded in 1939, 71st president of the Society of Automotive Engineers in 1948, and president of the American Society of Mechanical Engineers in 1952–53.

== Biography ==
=== Family, education and early career ===
Pigott was born in 1886 in Wellington, Shropshire, in England, to Elphic William Seymour Pigott and Lillian Mary (Fance) Pigott. In 1891 the family moved to New York City in the United States, where his father worked as an accountant.

After the regular public schools in New York City, Pigott studied mechanical engineering at Columbia University, obtaining his Mech.E. degree in 1906.

After his graduation in 1906, Pigott started his career at the Interborough Rapid Transit Company as chief draftsman, and later became construction engineer. In this position he was "in full charge of the design, construction, and testing of live 7500~kilowatt low-pressure turbines and had charge of the general rebuilding of the boilers` stokers, economizers, coal handling, and other equipment and operations in the company's two power plants."

In 1911–1912 he was assistant professor of steam engineering at Columbia University, but after a year he returned to the Interborough Rapid Transit Co. as construction engineer in the motive power department in 1912–1915.

For another eleven years, Pigott worked in the design, construction, and operation of central steam power stations. In the late 1910s and early 1920s, Pigott was a mechanical engineer with Stevens & Wood, Inc. in New York for three years, and then consulting engineer with Public Service Corporation of New Jersey Production Co.

=== Further career and acknowledgement ===
In 1929, Pigott was appointed chief engineer at the Gulf Research & Development Corporation in Pittsburgh, Pennsylvania, where he became active in petroleum research. His research was also focussed on the development of special equipment, such as the "marsh buggy" and piston ring pressure tester.

In World War II, "a good deal of research work was done for the automotive industry, particularly aviation, covering the investigation and solution of the problem of oil foaming in flight, heat distribution in high output aviation engines, the solution of difficult bearing problems for gas turbines and engines, and the manufacture of a good deal of special test equipment."

By the time of his retirement in 1953, Pigott had been director of the engineering division of Gulf Research and Development Company. He had written over 40 papers, and had obtained a few dozen patents.

In 1952, Pigott was awarded the Egleston Medal, the highest award of the Columbia Engineering School Alumni Association. In 1957 he received the Elliott Cresson Medal of the Franklin Institute. In 1965, he was elected an honorary member of the American Society of Mechanical Engineers.

== Selected publications ==
- Pigott, R. J. S., and A. T. Colwell. Hi-jet system for increasing tool life. No. 520254. SAE Technical Paper, 1952.

Articles, a selection

- Pigott, R. J. S. "The flow of fluids in closed conduits." Mechanical Engineering 55.8 (1933): 497–515.
- Pigott, R. J. S. "Mud flow in drilling." Drilling and Production Practice. American Petroleum Institute, 1941.
- Pigott, R. J. S. "Pressure losses in tubing, pipe, and fittings." Trans. ASME 72 (1950): 679–688.

Patents, a selection

- Pigott, Reginald JS. "Gear tooth shape." U.S. Patent No 1,909,117, 1933.
- Pigott, Reginald JS. "Pump." U.S. Patent No. 2,055,587. 29 Sep. 1936.
- Pigott, Reginald JS. "Chuck." U.S. Patent No. 2,282,676. 12 May 1942.
- Pigott, Reginald JS. "Internal gear pump and compressor." U.S. Patent No 2,458,958, 1949.
- Pigott, Reginald JS. "Method of applying cutting liquids." U.S. Patent No. 2,653,517. 29 Sep. 1953.
