= Irving Edwin Moultrop =

American engineer

Irving Edwin Moultrop (1865–1957) was an American engineer who pioneered high-pressure steam boilers for electricity generation. He received the 1930 Elliott Cresson Medal of the Franklin Institute.

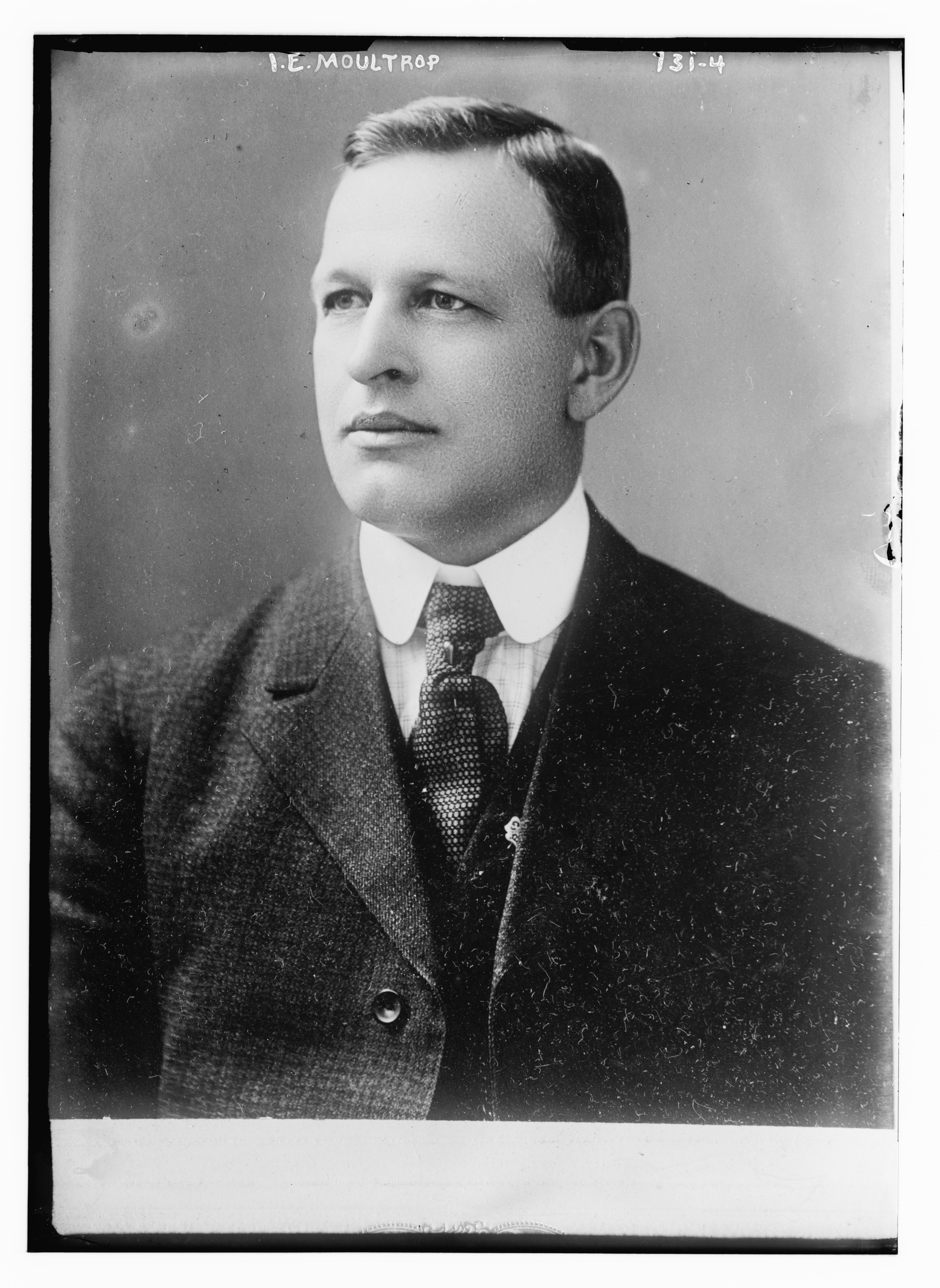
