= Everitt P. Blizard =

Canadian-born American nuclear physicist and nuclear engineer

Everitt Pinnell Blizard (30 September 1916 – 22 February 1966) was a Canadian-born American nuclear physicist and nuclear engineer, known for his work on nuclear reactor physics and shielding.

== Biography ==
Blizard was born September 30, 1916, in Ottawa, Canada. A few years after his birth, Everitt Blizard moved with his family from Canada to Pittsburgh and then to Garden City, New York, where he attended Garden City High School. He earned a bachelor's degree in chemistry from Wesleyan University in 1938 and a master's degree in physics from Columbia University in 1941. While working for his PhD at Columbia, he was recruited by the U.S. Navy, where he became the chief physicist at the 10th Naval District. After spending the war years working for the Navy and working on Operation Crossroads in 1946, he was recruited by Admiral Hyman Rickover to work at ORNL for the Navy's nuclear reactor program. Blizard was appointed the group leader of shielding research in the Physics Division of ORNL and then was promoted to associate division director in 1954. In 1955 he became director of the Neutron Physics Division, continuing in this position until his death from leukemia in 1966. He was the most important physicist and engineer for nuclear reactor shielding for the submarines Nautilus and Seawolf and the ship Savannah. At ORNL he directed the development of four major test facilities for research in nuclear reactor shielding. His pioneering team developed experiments, models, and nuclear data essential for shielding and introduced the concept of neutron removal cross-section. Blizard won the 1966 Elliott Cresson Medal.

Before completing his doctorate work, he was employed by the Navy in 1941. As a result of his contributions in such programs as the "CROSSROADS" atom bomb tests at Bikini, he was selected by Captain Hyman Rickover to participate in the nuclear submarine program and was sent to Oak Ridge, Tennessee, to attend the charter session of a nuclear training school. Although intended to be temporary, his stay in Oak Ridge continued until his death from leukemia in 1966. "Bliz," as he was better known, began with a small group of pioneers at Oak Ridge National Laboratory and developed a significant division of researchers addressing all aspects of radiation shielding, including experiments, analytical models, and nuclear data. Four major test facilities were constructed under his leadership, beginning with the "Core Hole" facility - a 2-ft-square hole in the shield of the original X-10 Graphite Reactor. Although immediately successful, the facility had significant limitations, and the group went on to develop more powerful and more flexible test facilities, including the Lid Tank Shielding Facility, the Bulk Shielding Facility, and the Tower Shielding Facility. This latter facility provided the international shielding community with abundant benchmark data over a span of nearly four decades. Blizard also recognized the importance of analytic methods and was instrumental in bringing theoretical physicists together to develop and apply new methods. His exploitation of the concept of a neutron removal cross section had, perhaps, the widest impact on early methods development. Beyond Bliz's technical leadership, his humanistic interest and sensitivity toward others often led him into a role as international ambassador for reactor shielding. He was one of the scientific members of the U.S. Atoms for Peace Mission to the Far East in 1957 and participated in numerous other outreach missions. He also contributed substantially to many handbooks and encyclopedias, including the shielding portion of the Reactor Handbook and the Engineering Compendium on Radiation Shielding. Because of this vision, his technical alertness, and his warm and inspiring personality, Blizard is rightly recognized as the "father of reactor shielding" and is credited with bringing the field of reactor radiation shielding from an empirical rule-of-thumb craft to a distinct discipline in nuclear science and technology. As with many scientists of his day, he was a warm human being who inspired many young people to attain goals they never thought were possible. He had a knack for selecting the right individual for the job and giving them the guidance and trust they needed to succeed.

On 1 January 1943 he married Barbara Rogers and had a son Steven in 1948.

A scholarship is given in his name each year to a student enrolled in graduate-level studies in the field of radiation protection and shielding by the American Nuclear Society.
