= Luther D. Lovekin =

American marine engineer and inventor

- Born: Luther Daniel Lovekin; March 29, 1869
- Died: November 19, 1937 (aged 68); Villanova, Pennsylvania, U.S.
- Occupations: Marine engineer, inventor
- Awards: Elliott Cresson Medal (1904); John Scott Medal (1907)
- Scientific career
- Fields: Marine engineering

Luther Daniel Lovekin (March 29, 1869 – November 19, 1937) was an American marine engineer and inventor.

Lovekin won the Elliott Cresson Medal in 1904 and the John Scott Medal in 1907 for his inventions. Lovekin was born in the United Kingdom and came to the United States as a child, and started working in the shipbuilding field in the 1880s. He was named chief engineer at the New York Shipbuilding Corporation in 1900. During World War I, he moved to the American International Shipbuilding Corporation as vice president and advisory engineer. He was also president of the Lovekin Pipe Expanding and Flanging Machine Company.

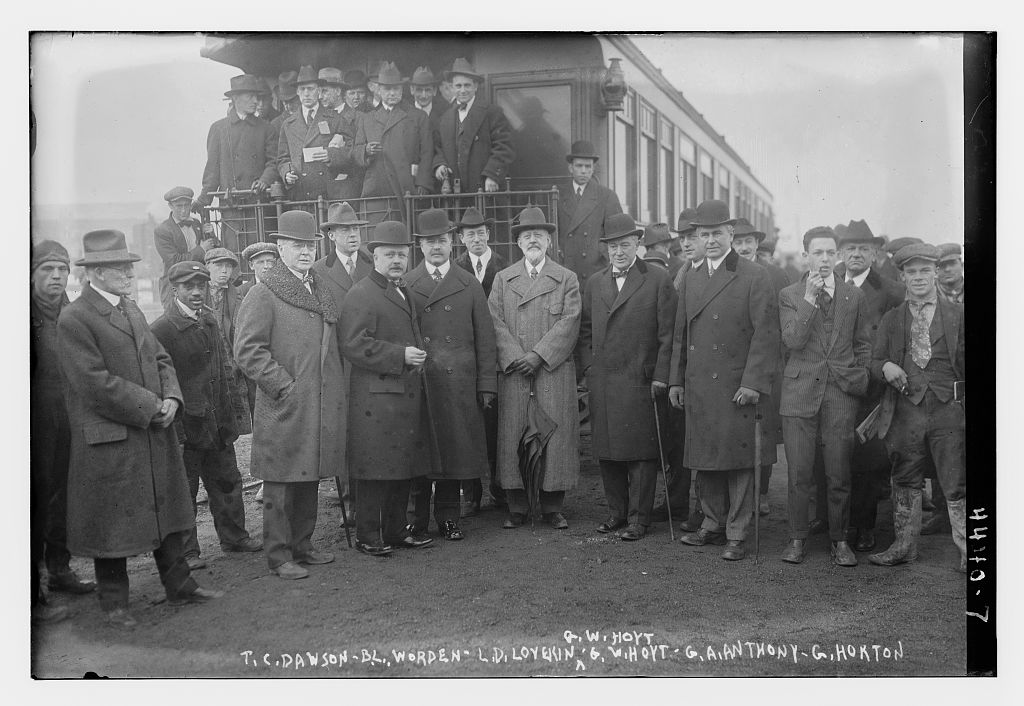
Group photo at Submarine Boat Corporation

Charles A. Stone of Stone & Webster once referred to Lovekin as "the greatest marine engineer in the world".

He died at his home in Villanova, Pennsylvania, on November 19, 1937, after a four-year illness, at age 68.
