= Harold P. Eubank =

American physicist

Harold Porter Eubank (23 October 1924 – 23 March 2006, in Kilmarnock, Virginia) was an American physicist, specializing in magnetic fusion energy research.

Eubank grew up in rural Virginia and then in WW II served in the U.S. Army, receiving a Bronze Star. He received in 1948 a B.S. in physics from the College of William and Mary, in 1950 an M.S. from Syracuse University, and in 1953 a Ph.D. from Brown University. He was an assistant professor at Brown University until 1959. From 1959 to 1985 Eubank was a research physicist at the Princeton Plasma Physics Laboratory (PPPL). He headed neutral beam research at PPPL and was one of the world's leading experts on high temperature plasmas heated by neutral beams. In 1977 he was the chair of the Division of Plasma Physics at the American Physical Society.

Eubank published more than 100 papers and spoke frequently at scientific meetings in the U.S. and internationally. Upon his death he was survived by his widow, two sons, a daughter, two granddaughters, two step-children, and his first wife.

== Awards and honors ==
- 1975 — elected a Fellow of the American Physical Society
- 1981 — Distinguished Associate Award from the United States Department of Energy
- 1982 — Elliott Cresson Medal and a Life Fellow Membership from the Franklin Institute in Philadelphia
