= Elliott Cresson Medal =

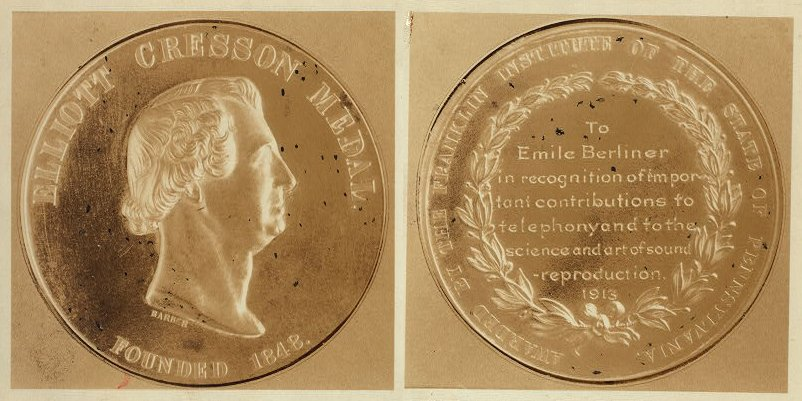
- Elliott Cresson Medal given to Emile Berliner in 1913
- Country: USA
- Presented by: Franklin Institute
- First award: 1875
- Final award: 1997

The Elliott Cresson Medal, also known as the Elliott Cresson Gold Medal, was the highest award given by the Franklin Institute. The award was established by Elliott Cresson, life member of the Franklin Institute, with $1,000 granted in 1848. The endowed award was to be "for a discovery in the Arts and Sciences, or for the invention or improvement of some useful machine, or for a new process or combination of materials in manufactures, or for ingenuity skill or perfection in workmanship." The medal was first awarded in 1875, 21 years after Cresson's death.

The Franklin Institute continued awarding the medal on an occasional basis until 1998 when they reorganized their endowed awards under one umbrella, The Benjamin Franklin Awards.

== List of recipients ==
A total of 268 Elliott Cresson Medals were given out during the award's lifetime.

Year	Awardee	Category	Citation
1875	William Gibson A. Bonwill	Life Science	Electro Magnetic Dental Mallet
1875	Fiss, Banes, Erben & Co.	Engineering	Worsted Yarns
1875	Powers & Weightman	Engineering	Drug Manufacturing
1875	William P. Tatham	Invention	Printing press
1875	Benjamin Chew Tilghman	Engineering	Sand Blast
1875	Joseph Zentmayer	Engineering	Microscopes and Objectives
1877	John Charlton	Engineering	Shaft Coupling
1877	P. H. Dudley	Engineering	Dynomagraph
1878	Henry Bower	Chemistry	Inodorous Glycerin
1878	Cyrus Chambers Jr.	Engineering	Bolt and rivet clipper
1878	Williams Farr Goodwin	Engineering	Competitive test of mowing machines
1879	Norbert Delandtsheer	Invention	Machine for Testing Flax
1880	Louis H. Spellier	Invention	Time Telegraph
1881	W. Woodnut Griscom	Engineering	Electric Induction Motor and Battery
1885	Cyprien Chabot	Engineering	Shoe Sewing Machine
1885	Frederick Siemens	Engineering	Regenerative Gas Burner
1886	Patrick Bernard Delany	Engineering	Synchronous Telegraphy
1886	Thaddeus S. C. Lowe	Engineering	Water Gas Process and Apparatus
1886	Ott & Brewer	Engineering	China and Porcelain Wares
1886	Pratt & Whitney Co.	Engineering	System of Interchangeable Cut Gears
1886	Robert H. Ramsay	Engineering	Railway Car Transfer Apparatus
1886	Liberty Walkup	Invention	Airbrush
1887	Charles F. Albert	Engineering	Violins and Bows
1887	Hugo Bilgram	Engineering	Bevel Gear Cutter
1887	Alfred H. Cowles	Engineering	Electric Smelting Furnace
1887	Eugene H. Cowles	Engineering	Electric Smelting Furnace
1887	Thomas Shaw	Engineering	Testing for Mine Gases and system of Mine Signaling
1889	Edward Alfred Cowper	Invention	Writing Telegraph
1889	Ottmar Mergenthaler	Engineering	Linotype machine
1889	T. Hart Robertson	Invention	Writing Telegraph
1889	George Frederick Simonds	Engineering	Universal Rolling Machine
1890	James B. Hammond	Engineering	Typewriter Improvements
1890	Herman Hollerith	Computer and Cognitive Science	Electric Tabulating Device
1890	Mayer Hayes & Co.	Engineering	Manufacture of files
1891	Stockton Bates	Engineering	Spindle Support
1891	James H. Bevington	Engineering	Welding Metal and Spinning and Shaping Tube
1891	Bradley Allen Fiske	Engineering	Rangefinder
1891	Tinius Olsen	Engineering	Testing Machine
1891	Edwin F. Shaw	Engineering	Spindle Support
1891	Samuel M. Vauclain	Engineering	Compound Locomotive
1891	George M. Von Culin	Engineering	Spindle Support
1892	Philip H. Holmes	Engineering	Composition for Journal Bearings
1892	Henry M. Howe	Engineering	Metallurgy of Steel
1893	Clifford H. Batchellor	Engineering	Compound Locomotive
1893	Frederic Eugene Ives	Engineering	Color photography
1893	George E. Marks	Life Science	Improvements in Artificial Limbs
1893	Paul von Jankó	Engineering	Jankó piano keyboard
1894	Nikola Tesla	Engineering	Alternating Electric Currents of High Frequency
1895	Henry M. Howe	Engineering	Experimental Researches on Steel
1895	James Peckover	Invention	Stone Sawing Machine
1895	Lester Allan Pelton	Engineering	Water Wheel
1896	Patrick Bernard Delany	Engineering	Telegraphy, High speed system
1896	Tolbert Lanston	Invention	Monotype Machine
1897	Hamilton Y. Castner	Engineering	Process of electrolytic decomposing of alkaline chlorides
1897	Elisha Gray	Engineering	Telautograph
1897	Charles Francis Jenkins	Invention	Phantoscope projector
1897	Wilhelm Conrad Röntgen	Physics	Discovery of X-rays
1897	Joseph Wilckes	Invention	Econometer
1898	Wilbur Olin Atwater	Engineering	Respiration Calorimeter
1898	Thomas Corscaden	Engineering	All-Wrought Steel Belt Pulley
1898	Clemens Hirschel	Invention	Venturi Meter
1898	Henri Moissan	Engineering	Investigations with his electric furnace
1898	Edward Bennett Rosa	Engineering	Respiration Calorimeter
1900	American Cotton Company	Engineering	Round Lap Bale System
1900	Louis Edward Levy	Engineering	Method and apparatus for acid blast etching of metal plates
1900	Pencoyd Iron Works	Engineering	Bridge construction
1900	United States Geological Survey	Earth Science	Exhibit of the USGS
1900	Carl Auer von Welsbach	Chemistry	Discoveries regarding metallic oxides
1901	Rudolph Diesel	Engineering	Diesel engine
1901	John S. Forbes	Chemistry	Process of automatically heating and sterilizing fluids
1901	Lewis M. Haupt	Engineering	Reaction Breakwater
1901	Mason & Hamlin Company	Engineering	Liszt Pipe Organ
1901	A. G. Waterhouse	Engineering	Process of automatically heating and sterilizing fluids
1902	Charles Ernest Acker	Engineering	Manufacturing Caustic Alkali and Halogen Gas
1902	Fred W. Taylor	Engineering	Process of Treating Tool Steel
1902	Maunsel White	Engineering	Process of Treating Tool Steel
1903	G. H. Clam	Engineering	Method of eliminating metals from mixtures of metals
1903	Joseph L. Ferrell	Engineering	Process of fireproofing wood
1903	Wilson Lindsley Gill	Engineering; Computer and Cognitive Science	School City Educational Plan
1903	Victor Goldschmidt	Engineering	Theory of Musical Harmony
1903	Frank J. Sprague	Engineering	System of Electric Traction
1904	James Mapes Dodge	Engineering	System of Storing Coal
1904	Wilson Lindsley Gill	Engineering; Computer and Cognitive Science	School City
1904	Hans Goldschmidt	Physics	Alumino-Thermics
1904	Louis E. Levy	Engineering	Machine for preparation of plates for etching
1904	L. D. Lovekin	Engineering	Expanding and Flanging Machinery for Tubes
1904	Alexander E. Outerbridge Jr.	Engineering	Molecular Structure of Cast Iron
1904	John Clinton Parker	Engineering	Steam Generator
1905	Gray National Telautograph Company	Engineering	Telautograph
1905	Michael Idvorsky Pupin	Physics	Reducing Attenuation of Electrical Waves
1906	American Paper Bottle Company	Engineering	Paper Milk Bottles
1906	William Joseph Hammer	(unspecified)	Historic Collection of Incandescent Electric Lamps
1907	Baldwin Locomotive Works	Engineering	Contributions to Evolution of American Locomotive
1907	John L. Borsch	Physics	A new Bi-Focal Lens
1907	J. Allen Heany	Engineering	Fireproof Insulated Wire
1907	Ferdinand Philips	Engineering	Pressed Steel Pulley for Power Transmission
1907	Edward R. Taylor	Chemistry	Electric Furnace Manufacture of Carbon bisulfide
1908	Romeyn Beck Hough	Engineering	Uses of American Woods
1908	Anatole Mallet	Engineering	Improved Articulated Compound Locomotive
1909	Marie Curie	Chemistry	The discovery of radium
1909	Pierre Curie	Chemistry	The discovery of radium
1909	Wolfgang Gaede	Engineering	Molecular Air Pump
1909	James Gayley	Engineering	Dry air blast in blast furnace operation
1909	Auguste and Louis Lumière	Engineering	Color photography
1909	George Owen Squier	Engineering	Multiplex Telephony
1909	Benjamin Talbot	Engineering	Open Hearth Steel Process
1909	Walter Victor Turner	Engineering	Air Brake Design and Application
1909	Underwood Typewriter Co.	Engineering	Underwood Typewriter
1909	Alexis Vernasz	Engineering	Milling files
1909	H. A. Wise Wood	Engineering	The Autoplate Machine
1910	Automatic Electric Company	Engineering	Automatic System of Telephony
1910	John A. Brashear	Physics	Distinguished work in astronomical instruments
1910	Peter Cooper Hewitt	Invention	Mercury rectifier
1910	John Fritz	Engineering	Distinguished work in iron and steel industries
1910	Robert Abbott Hadfield	Engineering	Distinguished work in metallurgical sciences
1910	Ernest Rutherford	Engineering	Distinguished work in electrical theory
1910	Joseph John Thomson	Physics	For distinguished work in physical sciences
1910	Edward Weston	Engineering	Distinguished work in electrical discovery
1910	Harvey W. Wiley	Life Science	Distinguished work in agricultural chemistry
1912	Alexander Graham Bell	Engineering	Electrical Transmission of Articulate Speech
1912	William Crookes	Chemistry	Discoveries in Chemistry
1912	Alfred E Noble	Engineering	Distinguished work in civil engineering
1912	Edward Williams Morley	Chemistry	Determination of fundamental magnitudes in chemistry
1912	Albert A. Michelson	Physics	Investigations in physical optics
1912	Sir Henry Enfield Roscoe	Chemistry	Important Research in Chemistry
1912	Samuel Wesley Stratton	Engineering	Distinguished work in metrology
1912	Elihu Thomson	Engineering	Industrial applications of electricity
1912	Adolf von Baeyer	Chemistry	Extended research in organic chemistry
1913	Emile Berliner	Engineering	Contributions to telephony and science of sound reproduction
1913	Hermann Emil Fischer	Life Science	Organic and biological chemistry
1913	Sir William Ramsay	Chemistry	Discoveries in chemistry
1913	Isham Randolph	Engineering	Distinguished work in civil engineering
1913	John Strutt	Physics	Extended researches in physical science
1913	Albert Sauveur	Engineering	Metallography of Iron and Steel
1913	Charles Proteus Steinmetz	Engineering	Analytical methods in electrical engineering
1914	Josef Maria von Eder	Chemistry	Original Researches in Photo-Chemistry
1914	Carl Paul Gottfried von Linde	Engineering	Liquefaction of gases and refrigeration
1914	Edgar Fahs Smith	Chemistry	Leading work in electro-chemistry
1914	Orville Wright	Engineering	The art and science of aviation
1915	Michael J. Owens	Engineering	Automatic Bottle Blowing Machine
1916	American Telephone & Telegraph	Engineering	Development of the Art of telephony
1916	Byron E. Eldred	Engineering	Low Expansion Wire for Incandescent Lamps
1916	Robert Gans	Engineering	Permutit water softening process
1917	Edwin Fitch Northrup	Engineering	Investigation of Electric Furnaces and High Temperature
1918	Isaac Newton Lewis	Engineering	Lewis Machine Gun
1920	William LeRoy Emmet	Engineering	Electrical Propulsion of Ships
1923	Lee DeForest	Engineering	Audion
1923	Raymond D. Johnson	Engineering	Hydraulic Valve
1923	Albert Kingsbury	Engineering	Thrust bearing
1925	Francis Hodgkinson	Engineering	Turbo-Electric Appliances
1926	George Ellery Hale	Physics	Astronomical Researches of sun, solar atmosphere and solar physics
1926	Charles S. Hastings	Engineering	Design of Optical Systems
1927	Dayton C. Miller	Physics	Researches in Sound
1927	Edward Leamington Nichols	Physics	Investigations in the Physical Sciences
1928	Gustaf W. Elmen	Engineering	Permalloy
1928	Henry Ford	Engineering	Revolutionizing automobile industry, and industrial leadership
1928	Vladimir Karapetoff	Computer and Cognitive Science	Kinematic Computing Devices
1928	Charles L. Lawrance	Engineering	Wright Whirlwind Air-Cooled Engine, Model J-5
1929	James Colquhoun Irvine	Life Science	Carbohydrate chemistry
1929	Chevalier Jackson	Life Science	Instruments for Removal of Foreign Bodies from Respiratory and food Passages
1929	Elmer Ambrose Sperry	Engineering	Navigational and Recording Instruments (Gyroscopic)
1930	Norman Rothwell Gibson	Physics	Measurement of Liquid Flow in Closed Conduits
1930	Irving Edwin Moultrop	Engineering	High Pressure Steam Boilers in Electric Generating Stations
1931	Clinton Joseph Davisson	Physics	Scattering and diffraction of electrons by crystals
1931	Lester Halbert Germer	Physics	Scattering and Diffraction of Electrons by Crystals
1931	Kotaro Honda	Engineering	Contributions to magnetism and metallurgy
1931	Theodore Lyman	Physics	Work in Spectroscopy
1932	Percy W. Bridgman	Physics	Work in high pressure
1932	Charles LeGeyt Fortescue	Engineering	Symmetrical Coordinates in Polyphase Networks
1932	John B. Whitehead	(unspecified)	Dielectric Behavior
1933	Walther Bauersfeld	Physics	Optical Planetarium
1933	Juan de la Cierva	Engineering	Autogiro-flying machine with freely rotating wings
1934	Stuart Ballantine	Engineering	Vertical Antenna for Radio Transmission
1934	Union Switch & Signal	Engineering	Continuous Cab Signal and Automatic Train Control Systems
1936	George O. Curme	Chemistry	Development of synthetic aliphatic chemistry
1936	Robert J. Van de Graaff	Engineering	High Voltage Electrostatic Generator
1937	Carl David Anderson	Chemistry	Discovery of the positron
1937	William Bowie	Earth Science	Contributions to the Science of Geodesy (Isostasy)
1937	Jacques Edwin Brandenberger	Engineering	Process for Manufacture of Cellophane
1937	William F. Giauque	Physics	Low temperature research
1937	Ernest O. Lawrence	Engineering	Development of the Cyclotron
1938	Edwin H. Land	Engineering	Polaroid camera
1939	Charles Vernon Boys	Physics	Creation of new methods for measuring gravitation, sound, heat, radiation and current and static electricity
1939	George Ashley Campbell	Engineering	Theory of electric circuits for improvements in telephony
1939	John R. Carson	Engineering	Contributions to electric communications
1940	Frederick M. Backet	Engineering	Low carbon ferro-alloys and electro-metallurgy
1940	Robert R. Williams	Life Science	Researches upon Vitamin B1 including its isolation in the pure state in quantities sufficient for further study
1941	United States Navy	Engineering	Submarine rescue devices, U.S. lung and rescue chamber
1942	Claude Silbert Hudson	Life Science	Investigation in Carbohydrate chemistry
1942	Isidor I. Rabi	Physics	Measurement of magnetic moments of atomic nuclei, and their radio frequency spectra
1943	Charles Metcalf Allen	Engineering	Salt velocity method for measuring the flow of water in conduits
1944	Roger Adams	Chemistry	Contributions in organic chemistry
1945	Stanford Caldwell Hooper	Engineering	Leadership in field of radio for U.S. Navy
1945	Lewis Ferry Moody	Engineering	Hydraulic turbines
1946	Gladeon M. Barnes	Engineering	Contributions to design and development of anti-aircraft guns, tanks, seacoast artillery and welded gun carriages
1948	Edwin H. Colpitts	Engineering	Practical systems of long-distance communications
1950	Basil Ferdinand Jamieson Schonland	Physics	Work in the field of atmospheric electricity and the mechanism of lightning discharge
1952	Edward C. Molina	Engineering	Contributions to improvement of telephonic communications by applying mathematical probability to the study of telephone traffic and by the invention of switching equipment
1952	H. Birchard Taylor	Engineering	Development of the single runner vertical reaction turbine
1953	William Blum	Physics	Scientific basis for the electro-deposition of metals
1953	George Russell Harrison	Physics	Precision measurement in Zeeman effect
1953	William F. Meggers	Physics	Contributions to field of spectroscopy and to the knowledge of the electronic structure of many elements
1955	F. Philip Bowden	Physics	For extensive investigations involving frictions between solid surfaces
1957	Willard F. Libby	Physics	Technique of radio carbon dating
1957	Reginald James Seymour Pigott	Engineering	Engineering accomplishments, inventions and leadership
1957	Robert Alexander Watson-Watt	Engineering	Pulsed radar, and development of radar systems
1958	Joseph C. Patrick	Chemistry	Discoveries in polysulfide polymers and new processes of combining chemical compounds for the manufacture of synthetic rubber
1958	Stephen P. Timoshenko	Engineering	Theory of elasticity and elastic stability
1959	John Hays Hammond	Engineering	Developed remote radio control of moving vehicles
1959	Henry Charles Harrison	Engineering	Matched impedance principle in electro-mechanical devices
1959	Irving Wolff	Engineering	Contributions to radio, radar and electronics
1960	Hugh Latimer Dryden	Engineering	Contributions to theory and application of aerodynamics which advanced the art of wind tunnel and aircraft design and for contributions to design and development of first automatic radar homing guided missile
1960	Arpad Ludwig Nadai	Engineering	Pioneering work in elasticity of materials
1960	William Francis Gray Swann	Physics	Significant studies in the field of cosmic radiation
1961	Donald A. Glaser	Physics	The bubble chamber for tracking and photographing tracks of high energy ionizing particles and the fragments of nuclear collisions
1961	Rudolf L. Mössbauer	Physics	Discovery of recoilless emission
1961	Reinhold Rudenberg	Engineering	Performance of electric power systems
1961	James Alfred Van Allen	Physics	Pioneering achievements in space science, Van Allen Radiation Belts
1962	James G. Baker	Physics	Innovations in the design of astronomical instruments and the mathematics of optical design
1962	Wernher von Braun	Engineering	Liquid rocket motors and rocket development
1963	Nicholas Christofilos	Physics	Contributions to applied electromagnetism and nuclear physics such as conception of strong focusing principle in synchrotrons, the ARGUS experiment and principles in Astron development
1963	Grote Reber	Physics	Radio astronomy, early radio telescopes, and the identification of the first radio star
1964	Waldo L. Semon	Engineering	Achievements in natural and synthetic rubber production
1964	Richard V. Southwell	Physics	Solution of buckling problems in physics and engineering
1964	Robert Rathbun Wilson	Physics	Contributions to the control and direction of high-energy particle beams and as a designer of instrumentation for measurement of high-energy physical phenomena
1965	Donald Dexter Van Slyke	Life Science	Clinical chemistry procedures and apparatus
1966	Everitt P. Blizard	Physics	Development of the theory of radiation shielding
1966	Herman Francis Mark	Chemistry	Polymers
1968	Neil Bartlett	Chemistry	Fluorine Compounds of Xenon and Radon
1969	Henry Eyring	Chemistry	Quantum mechanical calculations of activation energies
1969	Peter Carl Goldmark	Engineering	Contributions in the fields of electronics
1970	Walter Henry Zinn	Engineering	Nuclear power reactors
1971	Paul J. Flory	Chemistry	Polymer science
1971	John Hasbrouck Van Vleck	Physics	Theories of magnetism and dielectrics
1972	Brian D. Josephson	Physics	Josephson effect and theory of matter at low temperatures
1972	William Powell Lear	Engineering	Development of full maneuvering automatic pilot and Lear jet
1973	Allan R. Sandage	Physics	Astronomy
1973	John Paul Stapp	Life Science	Crash Injury Research
1974	Theodore L. Cairns	Chemistry	Percyano compounds, synthesis and exploration of chemical and physical properties
1974	Robert H. Dicke	Physics	Role in gravitational experiment and theory
1974	Arie Jan Haagen-Smit	Earth Science	Plant hormones and air pollution chemistry
1974	Bruno B. Rossi	Physics	Cosmic rays, gamma-ray astronomy
1975	Mildred Cohn	Life Science	Nuclear magnetic resonance analysis of enzymatic complexes
1975	Michael James Lighthill	Physics	Acoustic quadrupole theory of aerodynamic noise generation
1976	Leon Lederman	Physics	Leadership in forefront of experimentation in study of high energy interactions, nuclear forces and particle physics
1978	Herbert C. Brown	Chemistry	Development of methods for synthesis of diborane and alkali metal hydrides
1978	Frank H. Stillinger	Chemistry	Computer-generated model for water molecules
1979	Steven Weinberg	Physics	Unified theory of weak and electromagnetic interactions
1980	Riccardo Giacconi	Physics	Outstanding work in X-ray astronomy
1981	Marion King Hubbert	Earth Science	Application of quantitative methods to geological problems
1982	Harold P. Eubank	Physics	Plasma physics
1982	Edgar Bright Wilson Jr.	Physics	Contributions to the understanding of molecular structure and dynamics
1984	Elizabeth F. Neufeld	Life Science	For investigation of genetics of mucopolysaccharide storage disease
1985	Robert N. Clayton	Engineering	For the application of mass spectrometry to geoscience research
1985	Andrei Sakharov	Physics	For contributions to controlled thermonuclear reactions, baryon synthesis and proton decay, induced gravity and the quark model
1986	Leo P. Kadanoff	Physics	For contributions to the current understanding of second order phase transition
1987	Gerd Binnig	Physics	For development of the scanning tunneling microscope
1987	Heinrich Rohrer	Physics	For the development of scanning tunneling microscope
1988	Harry G. Drickamer	Engineering	For clarification of the role of pressure in producing paramagnetic-ferromagnetic and conductor-insulator transitions
1989	Edward Norton Lorenz	Physics	For interpretation of dynamical chaos in physical systems
1990	Marlan O. Scully	Physics	For his discoveries in laser physics and quantum optics, atomic and statistical physics, and biological engineering
1991	Yakir Aharonov	Physics	For observations of electromagnetic potentials and insights into quantum mechanics
1991	David Bohm	Physics	For elevated electromagnetic potentials to status of physical observables
1992	Lap-Chee Tsui	Life Science	For the discovery of the cystic fibrosis gene
1995	Marvin H. Caruthers	Life Science	For his contributions in automating the synthesis of DNA oligonucleotides
1995	Alfred Y. Cho	Physics	For development and refinement of techniques of molecular beam epitaxy for use in quantum physics
1997	Irwin Fridovich	Life Science	For discovering the biology of free radical reactions in living organisms
1997	Joe Milton McCord	Life Science	For discovering the biology of free radical reactions in living organisms

== See also ==
- List of engineering awards
- List of physics awards
