= William DeGrado =

William F. DeGrado
- Born: 12 September 1955 (age 71); Exeter, California
- Education: Kalamazoo College; University of Chicago
- Known for: De novo protein design and small molecule drug discovery
- Scientific career
- Fields: Chemistry, Biochemistry and Biophysics
- Workplaces: University of California, San Francisco

William DeGrado (born 12 September 1955) is a professor at the University of California, San Francisco, where he is the Toby Herfindal Presidential Professor of Entrepreneurship and Innovation in the Department of Pharmaceutical Chemistry. As an early pioneer of protein design, he coined the term de novo protein design. He is also active in discovery of small molecule drugs for a variety of human diseases. He is a member of the U.S. National Academy of Sciences (1999), American Academy of Arts & Sciences (1997) and National Academy of Inventors. He also is a scientific cofounder of Pliant therapeutics.

== Early life and education ==
Following high school graduation, DeGrado worked in a coat rack factory, an experience that motivated him to further his education. He attended colleges in the Chicago suburbs, while running a lawn-mowing service.

DeGrado received his B.A. in chemistry from Kalamazoo College (1978) and a doctorate in organic chemistry from the University of Chicago (1981).

== Industrial and academic career ==
After receiving his PhD in organic chemistry from the University of Chicago (1981) under the direction of Emil T. Kaiser, DeGrado began work at DuPont as a research chemist, eventually becoming a senior director for small molecule therapeutics in DuPont Merck's medicinal chemistry department. In 1995 he moved to the University of Pennsylvania, where he was a professor in the biochemistry and biophysics department as well as an adjunct professor in the department of chemistry. Since 2011 he has been at the University of California, San Francisco School of Pharmacy, where he is the Toby Herfindal Presidential Professor of Entrepreneurship and Innovation. He is also a member of the Cardiovascular Research Institute and an adjunct member of the Institute for Neurodegenerative Diseases at UCSF.

== Research ==
Starting in the 1980's DeGrado's group developed the approach of de novo protein design, a term they coined to describe the design of proteins from first principles rather than through modification of natural protein sequences. They pioneered parametric approaches to the design of water-soluble 4-helix (alpha4) and 3-helix bundles (alpha3D), and ion channel peptides. The protein, alpha3D, was notable at the time, because it was the premier example of a de novo protein, which was biologically expressed, structurally validated, and whose sequence and structure were not based on the sequence or the precise tertiary structure of a natural protein. The sequence of alpha3D was designed using the computational sidechain repacking algorithms that had recently been developed by Ponders & Richards, Desjarlais & Handel, Dahiyat & Mayo. The folding kinetics of alpha3D are among the most extensively characterized of single-domain proteins, and it has been used as a template for design of metalloproteins. The company Arcellx used alpha3D as a starting point for design of chimeric antigen receptors (CARs). Clinical data announced in 2020 showed deep and durable responses of multiple myeloma, illustrating the potential of de novo proteins for treatment of human disease.

With Angela Lombardi (University of Naples), Les Dutton and Michael Therien (Duke University) DeGrado has also designed numerous proteins that mimic many of the catalytic and electron relay properties of heme and non-heme iron proteins, including a transmembrane protein capable of shuttling electrons across membranes. His group has also designed the first examples of de novo ion and proton channels.

Because the original approaches to de novo protein design focused on physical chemical principles it was easily extended to design biologically active polymers and foldamers (short homogeneous, sequence-specific polymers that fold into unique structures). This work led to the design of Brilacidin, which is currently in phase II clinical trials.

== Contributions to Pharmaceutical Chemistry ==
DeGrado contributed significantly to the development of Brilacidin, which is in clinical trials for several indications. DeGrado's group also has contributed to the development of small molecule antagonists of integrins that reached clinical trials. His work on this subject with Dean Sheppard also formed the basis for founding Pliant Pharmaceuticals, a company conducting clinical trials on idiopathic pulmonary fibrosis (IPF) and primary sclerosing cholangitis.

== Awards ==
- 1988 Du Vigneaud Award for Young Investigators in Peptide Research
- 1989 Protein Society Young Investigator Award
- 1992 Eli Lilly Award in Biological Chemistry
- 1993 DuPont Merck Summit Award
- 1995 Fellow, American Association for the Advancement of Science
- 1998 Fellow, AAAS
- 1999 Member, National Academy of Sciences (U.S.A.)
- 2003 The American Peptide Society Merrifield Award
- 2008 The American Chemical Society Ralph F. Hirschmann Award in Peptide Chemistry
- 2009 The American Peptide Society Makineni Award
- 2015 The Stein & Moore Award of the Protein Society
- 2016 Weizmann Institute Max Perutz Memorial Lecture
- 2018 The American Chemical Society Cope Scholar Award
- 2018 The American Chemical Society Murray Goodman Memorial Prize
- 2020 The Franklin Institute & City Council of Philadelphia John C. Scott Award
- 2025 ACS Ronald Breslow Award for Achievement in Biomimetic Chemistry
