= Quality Engineering (journal) =

- Discipline: Quality control
- Language: English
- Edited by: Marcus Perry

Publication details
- History: 1989-present
- Publisher: Taylor & Francis on behalf of the American Society for Quality
- Frequency: Quarterly

Standard abbreviations
- ISO 4: Qual. Eng.

Indexing
- CODEN: QEUNA5
- ISSN: 0898-2112 (print); 1532-4222 (web)
- LCCN: 89643505
- OCLC no.: 17743171

Links
- Journal homepage; Journal page on ASQ website

Quality Engineering is a quarterly peer-reviewed scientific journal focusing on quality control and quality assurance management through use of physical technology, standards information, and statistical tools. The journal is published by Taylor & Francis on behalf of the American Society for Quality (ASQ). The editor-in-chief is Marcus Perry of the University of Alabama. Previous editors-in-chief have been Frank Caplan (1989-2004), David M. Lyth (2005-2006), James R. Simpson (2007-2008), G. Geoffrey Vining (2009-2010), Connie M. Borror (2011-2012), Peter A. Parker (2013-2015), and Murat Caner Testik (2016-2018).

The journal has published several special issues over the years:

1. Special Issue on Statistical Quality Control in Healthcare (Volume 20, Number 4, October–December 2008)
2. Special Issue on the First Stu Hunter Research Conference (Volume 26, Number 1, January–March 2014)
3. Special Issue on the Second Stu Hunter Research Conference (Volume 27, Number 1, January–March 2015)
4. Special Issue on Reliability (Volume 27, Number 3, July–September 2015)
5. Special Issue on the Third Stu Hunter Research Conference (Volume 28, Number 1, January–March 2016)

In 2017, the American Society for Quality published a compilation of Søren Bisgaard's articles that appeared over the years in several of the Society's journals. Bisgaard, who died in 2009, was an extremely productive and insightful scholar of modern industrial statistics and quality engineering. He was a professor of Technology Management at the University of Massachusetts Amherst and Professor of Business and Industrial Statistics at the University of Amsterdam.

Many of these articles had previously appeared in the Quality Quandaries column of Quality Engineering. The book is divided into four parts, as follows:

1. Design and Analysis of Experiments
2. Time Series Analysis
3. The Quality Profession, and
4. Healthcare Engineering.

The details of the book can be found in the References section below.
