= Carl Roman Abt =

Swiss mechanical engineer, inventor and entrepreneur

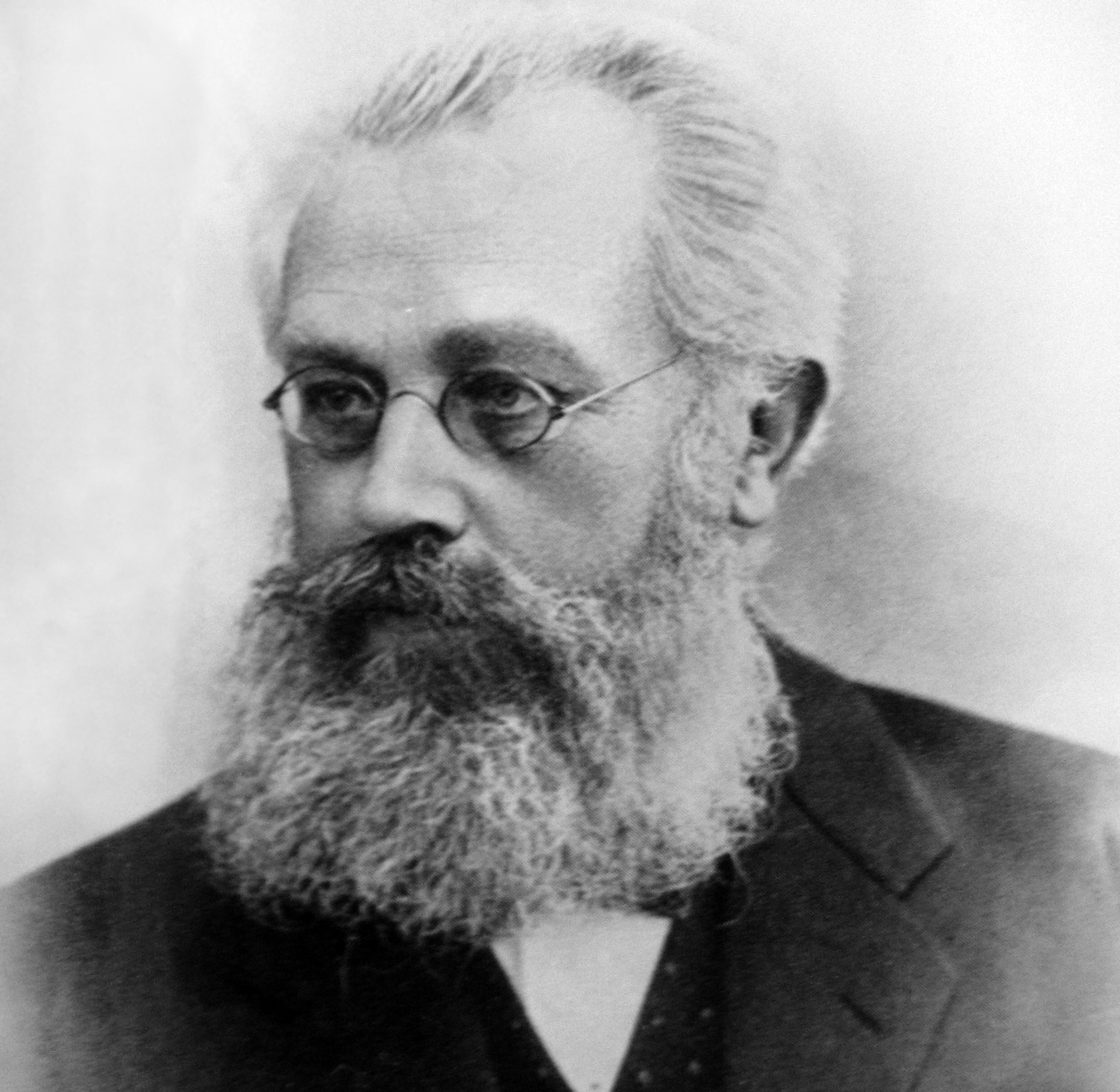
- Born: 16 July 1850; Bünzen
- Died: 1 May 1933 (aged 82); Lucerne
- Citizenship: Switzerland
- Children: none
- Parent(s): Roman Abt (1810–85), Marie Abt
- Engineering career
- Discipline: Rail transport
- Significant design: Funicular automatic turnout, Rack railway systems

Carl Roman Abt (16 July 1850 – 1 May 1933) was a Swiss mechanical engineer, inventor and entrepreneur. He made groundbreaking innovations in rack-and-pinion railways, giving his name to one of the most widely used systems developed for mountain railways, the Abt rack system.

== Biography ==
Abt was born on 16 July 1850 in Bünzen. In 1882, while working in Paris, he designed and patented his rack-railway system that enabled at least one tooth of the rack to be permanently engaged. It was first used at the Rübeland Railway in the Harz mountains (Germany).

Abt also developed the self-regulating Abt Switch for funicular railways and led the construction of 72 mountain railways worldwide including the Visp-Zermatt, Gornergrat, Furka Oberalp and Ferrovia Monte Generoso railways. The most famous railway built with the Abt system is the Arica–La Paz railway in Bolivia.

In 1903, as president of the Gotthardbahn company, Abt led buy-back negotiations with the German Confederation during the nationalisation of private railway companies. He received many honours, including an honorary doctorate (Doctor honoris causa) from the Technical University of Hannover and the John Scott Medal in 1889. He was also a patron and connoisseur of the arts, a member of the Swiss Federal Art Commission from 1904 to 1907 and the president of the Swiss Art Association from 1905 to 1911.

== Pastimes ==
Abt was a keen collector of hammered gold artwork; he would not let go of any coin or medal whose special beauty aroused his artistic interest. His coin and art collection was auctioned off after his death.

== Abt switch ==
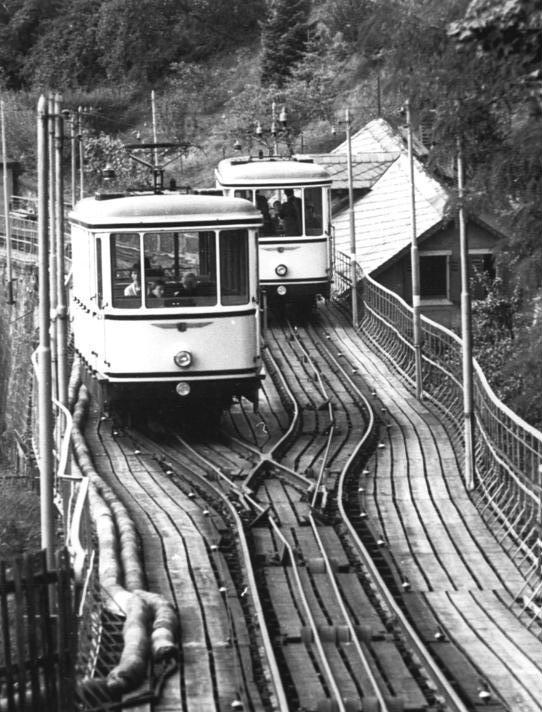
Abt switch used in 1895 built Dresden Funicular Railway (photo of 1985)

Funicular layout using Abt switches.

Abt switch is a railroad switch system invented by Carl Roman Abt. It is widely used in funicular railways. Railway vehicles used in the Abt switch don't have wheels with one flange as in ordinary railways, but instead use wheels with two flanges and wide wheels without flanges. Normally, two cars are used in a funicular, and it is a single track except for the passing loop. Each vehicle always passes the track on the same side at the passing loop, using wheels with two flanges on the outer side and wheels without flanges on the opposite side. The rail on the outside of the passing loop is sandwiched by the two flanges same as the rail in the single track section, and there is no break. The inner rails have cuts where the cable and flanges of the outer wheels pass. Wide wheels pass the cuts without hindrance. Unlike an ordinary railway switch, an Abt switch has no moving parts.

== Gallery ==
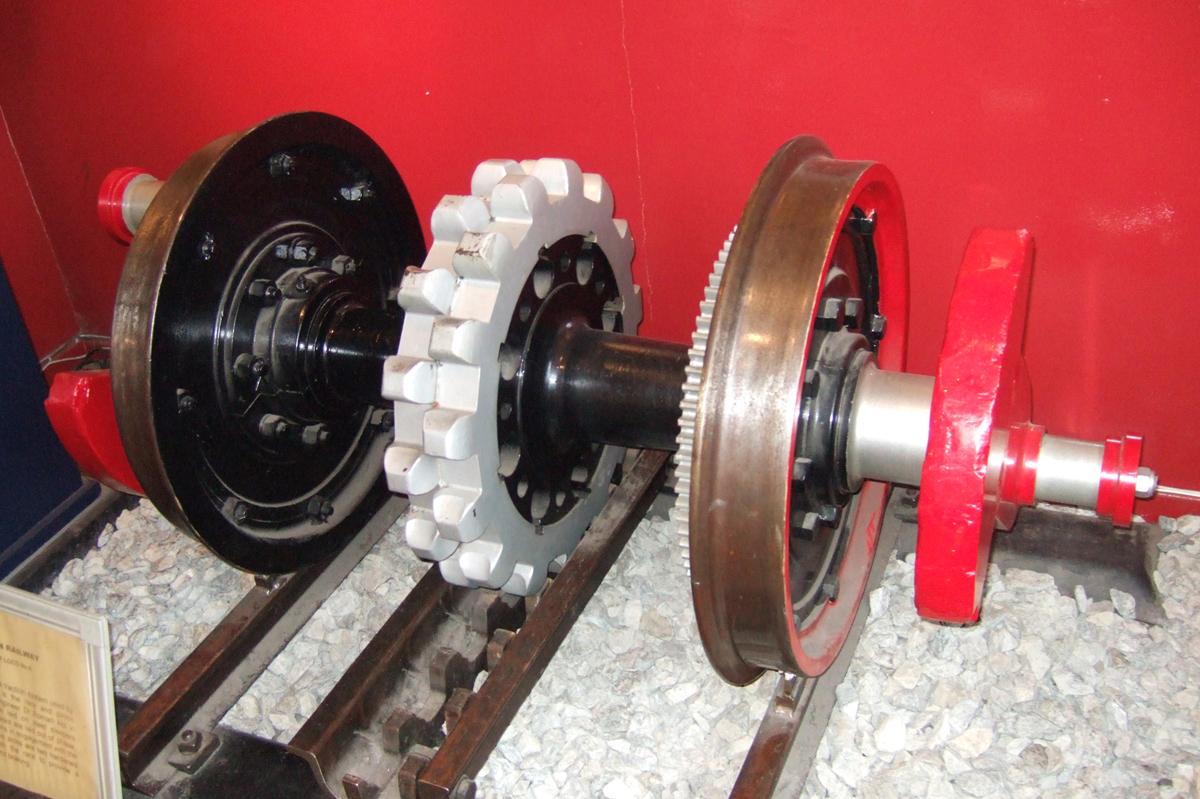
Abt rack system

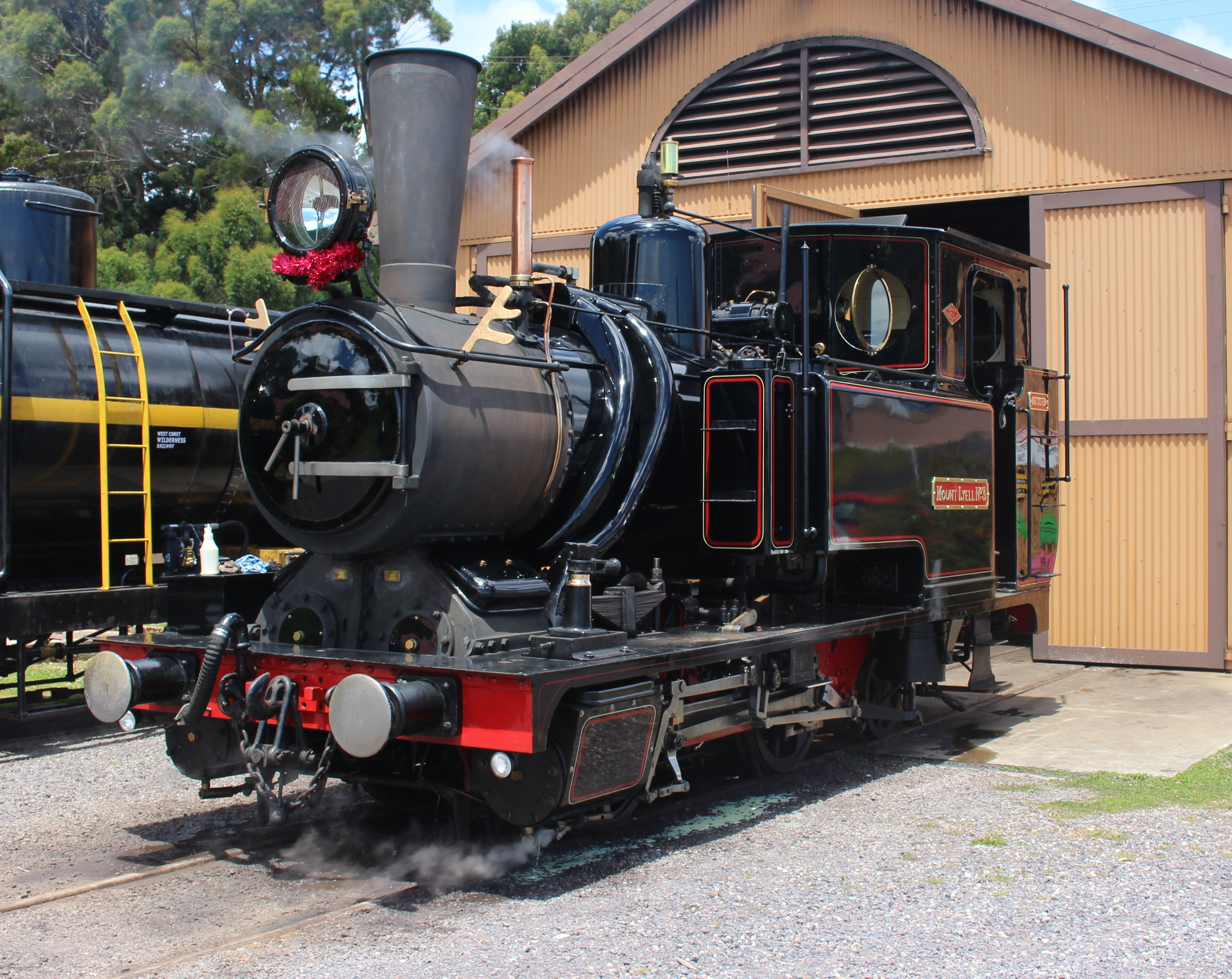
Mount Lyell Mining and Railway Company No. 3, an Abt type locomotive

== Sources ==
- Herring, Peter (2000). Ultimate Train, Dorling Kindersley Limited, London, 2000, p. 144. ISBN 0-7513-0698-3
- Wägli, Hans G. (2005). Carl Roman Abt. In: Sieben Bergbahnpioniere. Zürich 2005. S. 23–34. Schweizer Pioniere der Wirtschaft und Technik. Bd. 81.
