= Leslie Dutton =

British biochemist

Peter Leslie Dutton FRS is a British biochemist, and Eldridge Reeves Johnson Professor of Biochemistry and Biophysics in the Perelman School of Medicine at the University of Pennsylvania. He is a 2013 recipient of the John Scott Award for his work on electron transfer, studying the organization of electrons in cells and the mechanisms by which they convert light or oxygen into energy for the cell.

== Education ==
Leslie Dutton was born in England. He received a B.Sc. (Honors) in Chemistry at the University of Wales in 1963, and a Ph.D. in Biochemistry at the University of Wales in 1967.

== Research ==
In 1968, Leslie Dutton joined the University of Pennsylvania, where he now leads the Dutton lab at the Perelman School of Medicine. He is also Principal Investigator at the Photosynthetic Antenna Research Center.

Dr. Dutton attempts to understand elementary processes of oxidation-reduction and related biological events. Natural enzymes called oxidoreductases are involved in biological functions including gene regulation, signalling, long range electron transfer, energy conversion (in photosynthesis and respiration), atom transport, drug detoxification, and enzyme catalysis. Using physical, chemical and computational methods, the Dutton lab studies oxidoreductases and redox proteins to discover mechanisms of electron transfer over large distances through proteins and understand quantum mechanical electron tunneling theory. Understanding electron tunnelling gives scientists a foundation for investigation of biological redox reactions and their relationship to chemical events such as proton exchange, protein conformation, and energy conversion.

Through their understanding of such processes, Dutton and his lab have been able to manipulate electron transfer in structured highly simplified settings, and create man-made versions of proteins. Such maquettes, simple versions of their highly complex biological counterparts, enable researchers to model the minimal requirements for function. Futuristic applications could include creation of clean energy sources and prevention of genetic and age-related diseases.

== Awards and honors ==
- The First Sir William Dunn Scholar, Cambridge, 2007
- John Scott Medal, 2013
