= List of funicular railways =

This is a list of funicular railways, organised by place within country and continent. The funiculars range from short urban lines to significant multi-section mountain railways.

A funicular railway is distinguished from the similar incline elevator in that it has two vehicles that counterbalance one another rather than independently operated cars.

== Africa ==
=== Réunion ===
Location	Name of system	Date opened	Date closed	Notes
Saint-Benoît	Takamaka funicular	1968		Industrial funicular for Takamaka hydroelectric power stations employees

=== Saint Helena ===
Location	Name of system	Date opened	Date closed	Notes
Jamestown	Jacob's Ladder	1829	1871	

=== South Africa ===
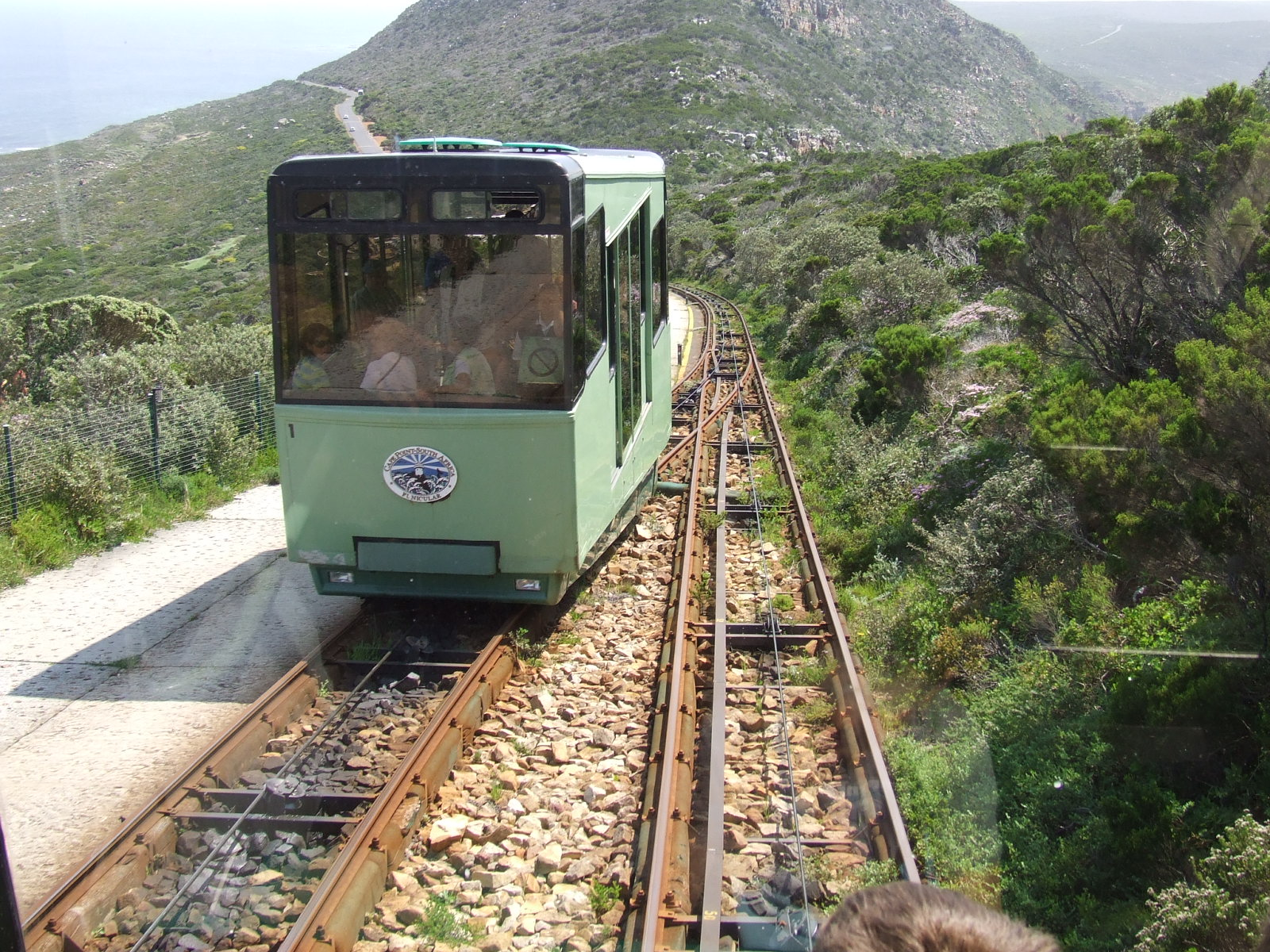
Flying Dutchman Funicular

Location	Name of system	Date opened	Date closed	Notes
Cape of Good Hope	Flying Dutchman Funicular	1996		

== Americas ==
=== Brazil ===
Location	Name of system	Date opened	Date closed	Notes
Niterói	Niterói funicular	1906	1950s	
Paranapiacaba	São Paulo Railway	1867 1982		Consist of two lines, (1982 later rack operated
Rio de Janeiro	Outeiro da Glória funicular	1942 (Modernized 2003)		
Rio de Janeiro	Paula Mattos funicular	1877	1926	
Salvador	Gonçalves funicular	1889		
Salvador	Liberdade-Calçada funicular	1981		
Salvador	Pilar funicular	1915 2006	1984 (later reopened)	Replacing a rack railway from 1897
Santos	Monte Serrat funicular	1927		

=== Canada ===
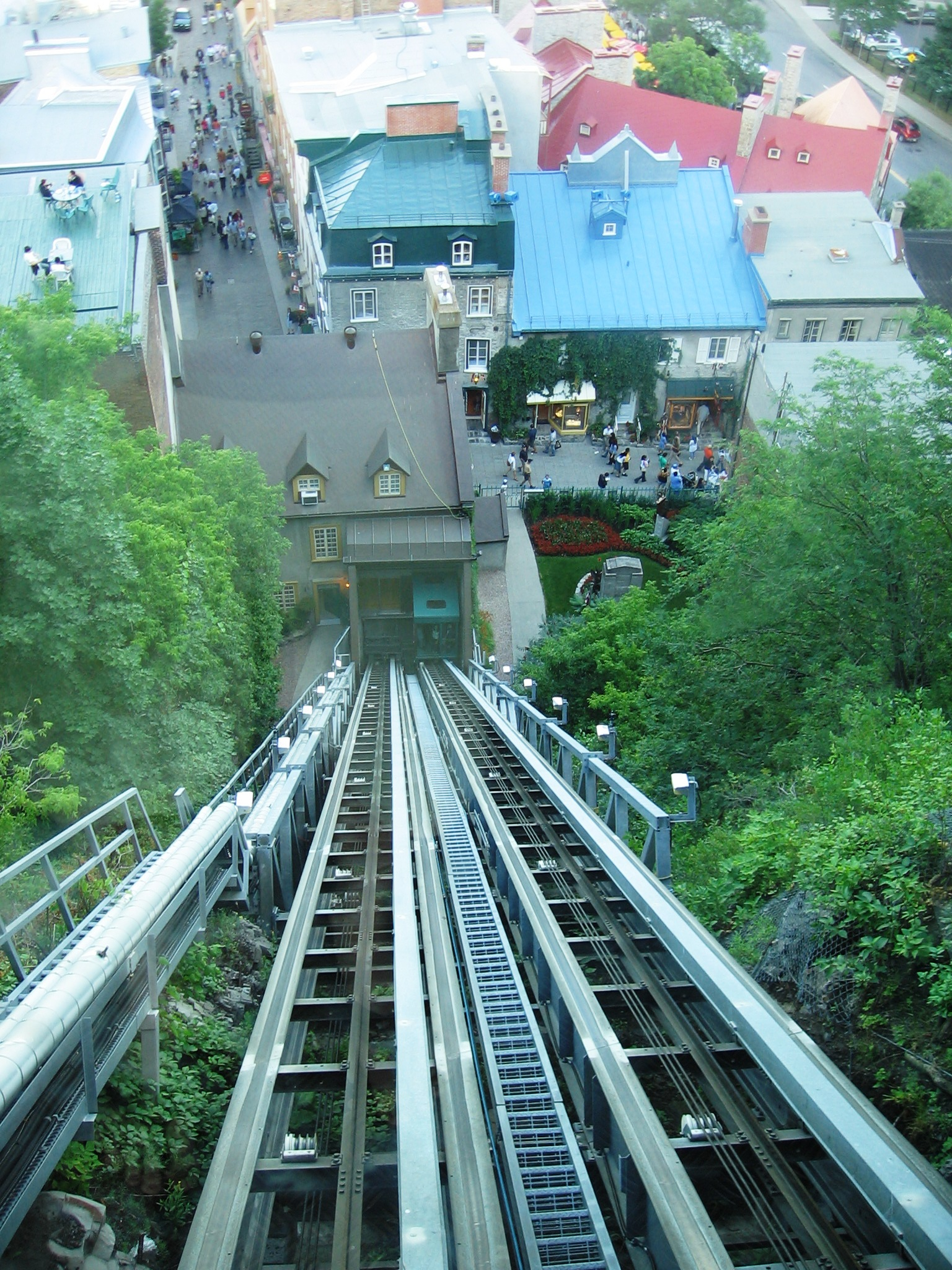
View from the Old Quebec Funicular

Province	Location	Name of system	Date opened	Date closed	Notes
Alberta	Edmonton	Edmonton Incline Railway	1908	1913	Now site of Stairs (Incline Railway).
Alberta	Edmonton	100 Street Funicular	2017		This is an inclined elevator, not a funicular
Ontario	Hamilton	Hamilton Incline Railway	1900	1936	
Ontario	Niagara Falls	Falls Incline Railway	1966		Also known as the Horseshoe Falls Incline
Ontario	Niagara Falls	Leander Colt Incline	circa 1869	1889	
Ontario	Niagara Falls	Hornblower Niagara Funicular (fomerly Maid of the Mist Incline)	1894 reopened 2019	1990 –	Also known as the Maid of the Mist Incline and the Clifton Incline
Ontario	Niagara Falls	Whirlpool Rapids Incline	circa 1876	1934	
Quebec	Montreal	Mount Royal Funicular Railway	1884	1918	
Quebec	Quebec City	Old Quebec Funicular	1879 (Cable)	1907 (Cable)	This has been modified to operate as a pair of inclined elevators, it is no longer a funicular
Quebec	Quebec City	Old Quebec Funicular	1907 (Electric) rebuilt in 1946, in operation to this day.	1945 (Electric)	This has been modified to operate as a pair of inclined elevators, it is no longer a funicular

=== Chile ===
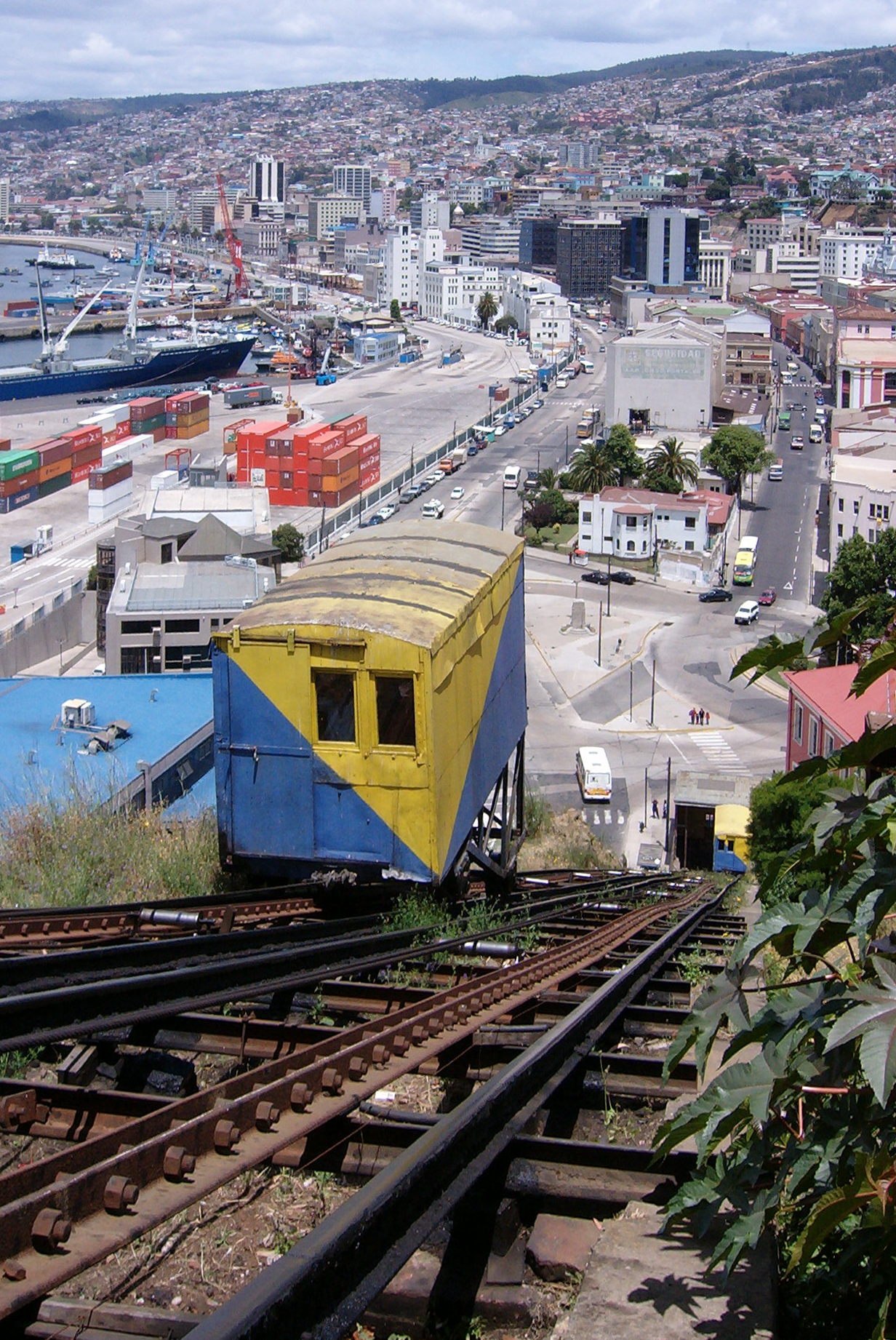
Artillería Elevator on Artillería hill, Valparaíso.

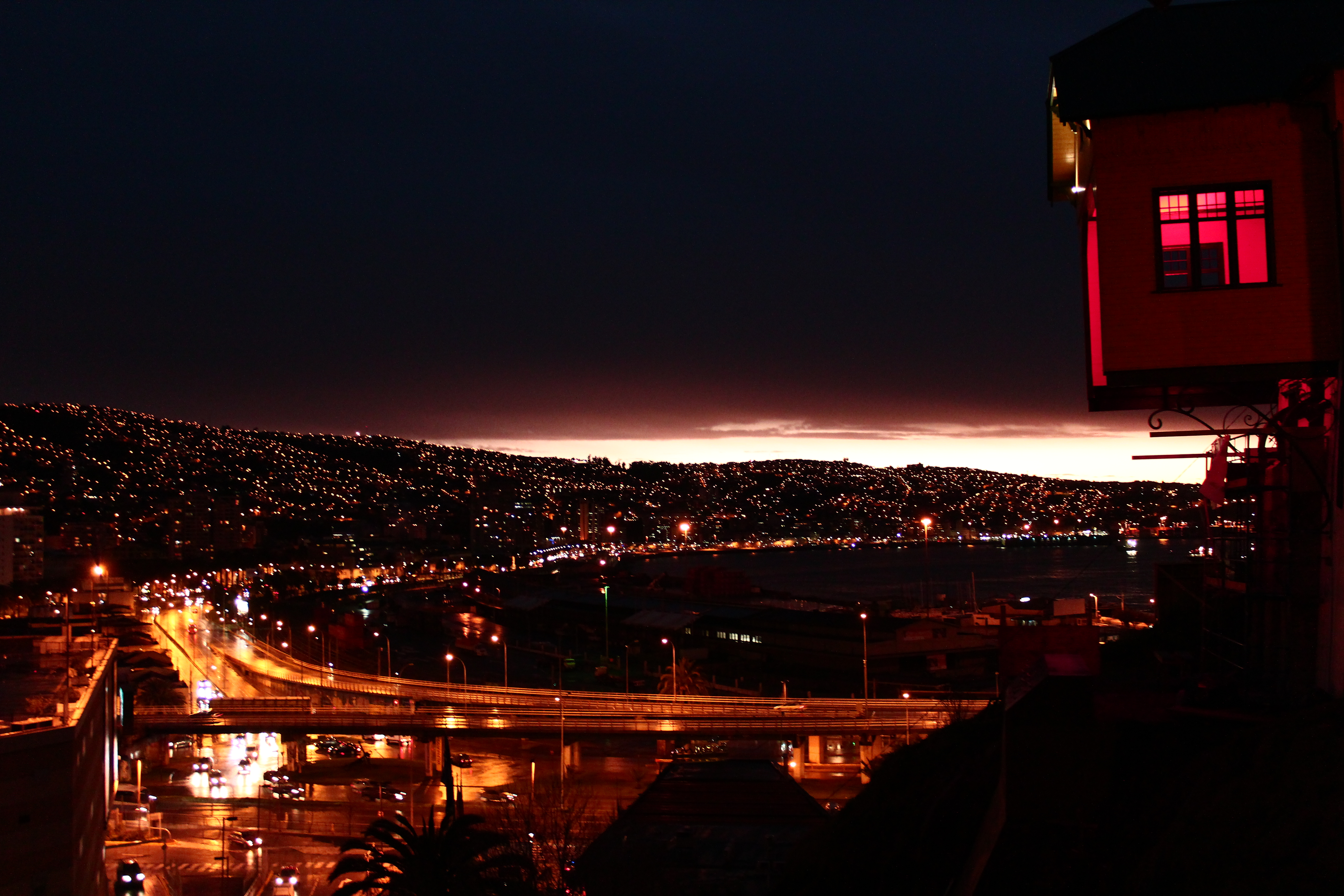
Barón funicular on Barón hill, Valparaíso, Chile

Location	Name of system	Date opened	Date closed	Notes
Santiago	Funicular de Santiago	1925		San Cristóbal Hill in Spanish Cerro San Cristóbal.
Santiago	Cerro Santa Lucía funicular	1902	1910	
Santiago	Hill 18 Elevator	2016		Cerro 18 funicular
Santiago	Parque de La Infancia funicular	2012		
Valparaíso	Arrayán funicular	1905	1964	
Valparaíso	Artillería funicular railway	1893		
Valparaíso	Barón funicular	1906		
Valparaíso	Ascensor Concepción funicular	1883		
Valparaíso	Bellavista funicular	1897	1955	
Valparaíso	Cordillera funicular	1887		
Valparaíso	El Hogar funicular	1912	1955	
Valparaíso	El Peral funicular	1902		
Valparaíso	Esmeralda funicular	1905	1962	
Valparaíso	Espíritu santo funicular	1911		
Valparaíso	Florida funicular	1906		
Valparaíso	Hospital Carlos van Buren funicular	1929		
Valparaíso	La Cruz funicular	1908	1992	
Valparaíso	Larrain funicular	1906		
Valparaíso	Las Monjas funicular	1912		
Valparaíso	Lecheros funicular	1906		
Valparaíso	Mariposas funicular	1906		
Valparaíso	Polanco funicular	1913		
Valparaíso	Pantéon funicular	1900	1952	
Valparaíso	Perdices funicular	1932	1962	
Valparaíso	Placeres funicular	1913	1971	
Valparaíso	Ramaditas funicular	1914	1955	
Valparaíso	Reina Victoria funicular	1903		
Valparaíso	San Agustin funicular	1913		
Valparaíso	Sant Domingo funicular	1910	1965	
Valparaíso	Villaseca funicular	1907		
Viña del Mar	Villanelo funicular	1983		

=== Colombia ===
Location	Name of system	Date opened	Date closed	Notes
Bogotá	Monserrate	1929		

=== Mexico ===
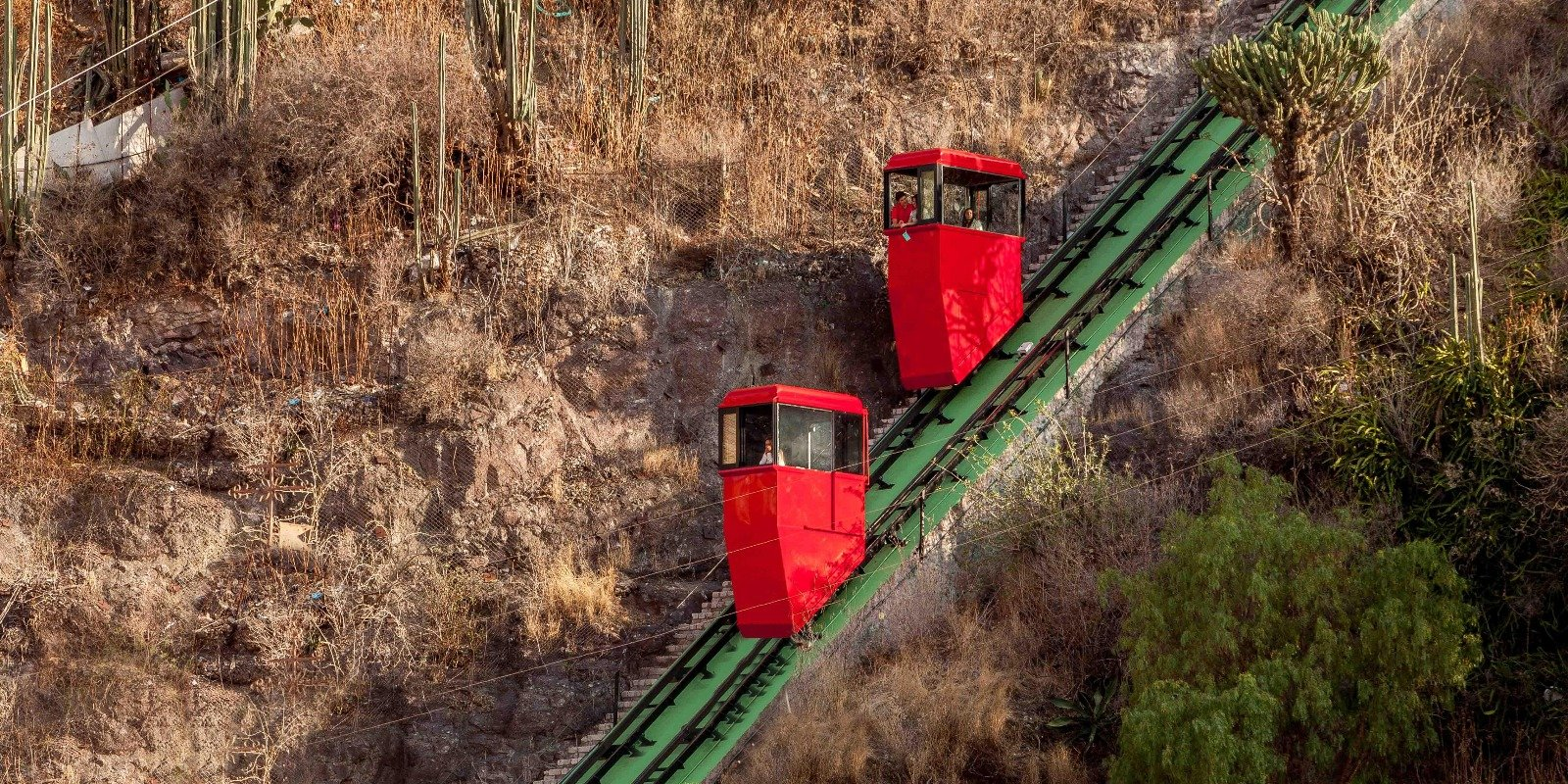
Funicular of Guanajuato

State	Location	Name of system	Date opened	Date closed	Notes
Guanajuato	Guanajuato City	Guanajuato funicular	2001		Guanajuato funicular inaugurated in 2001, it joins the theatre Juarez to the monument El Pipila.
Nuevo León	Monterrey	Grutas de García			Replaced by an aerial tramway)

=== Puerto Rico ===
Location	Name of system	Date opened	Date closed	Notes
Fajardo	El Conquistador Resort			

=== United States ===
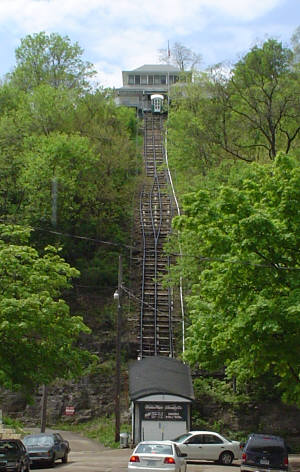
The Fourth Street Elevator in Dubuque, Iowa

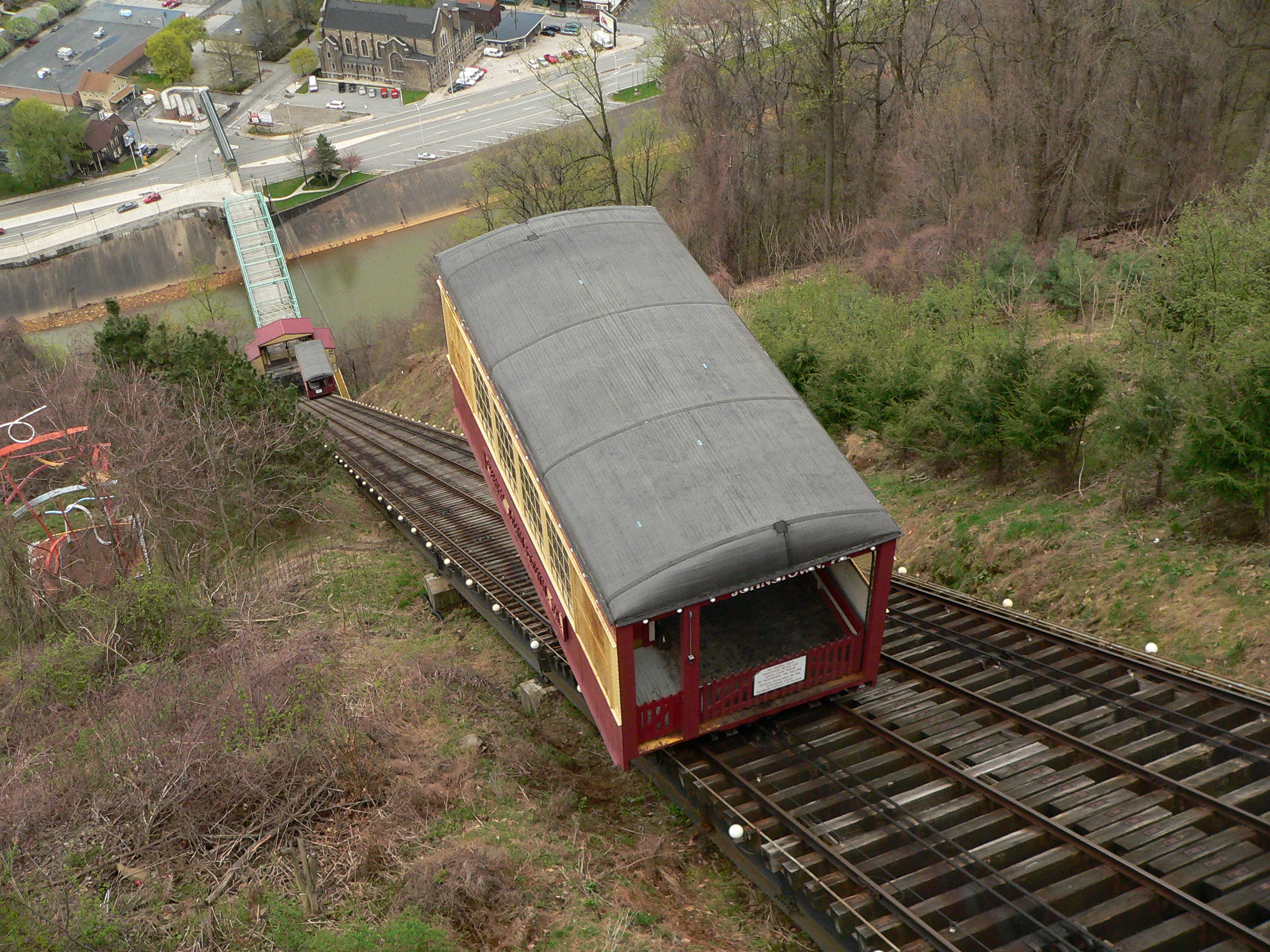
The Johnstown Inclined Plane in Johnstown, Pennsylvania

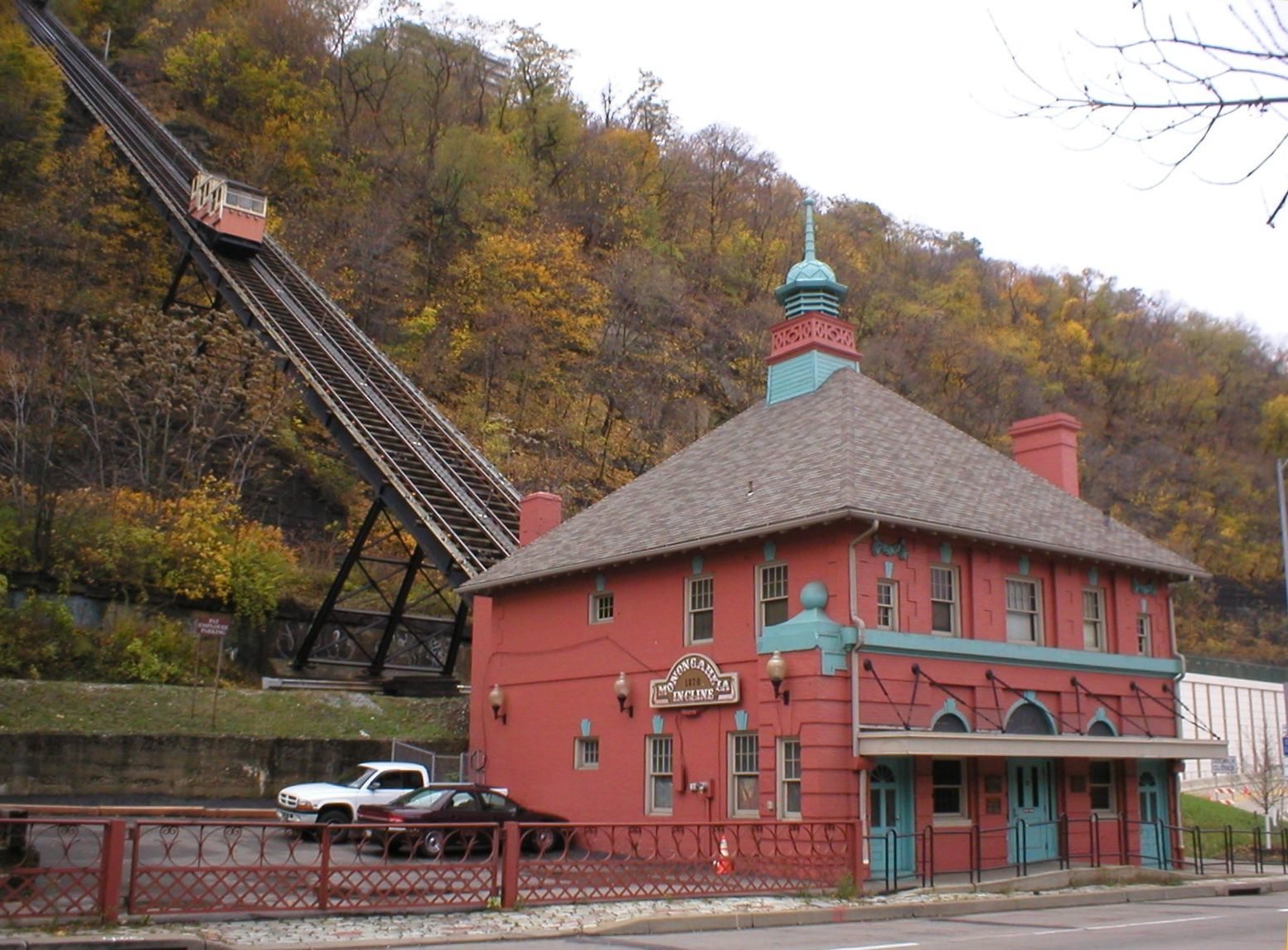
The Monongahela Incline in Pittsburgh, Pennsylvania

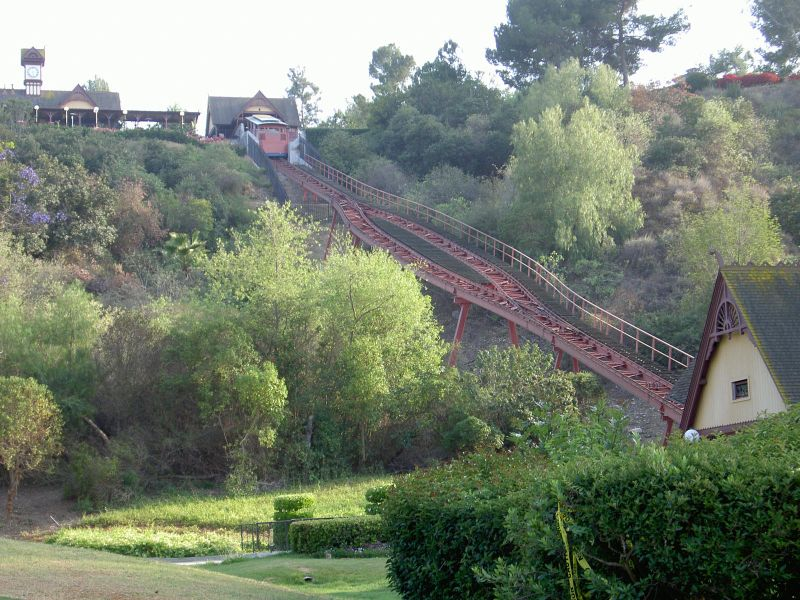
The Industry Hills Golf Club funicular in City of Industry, California

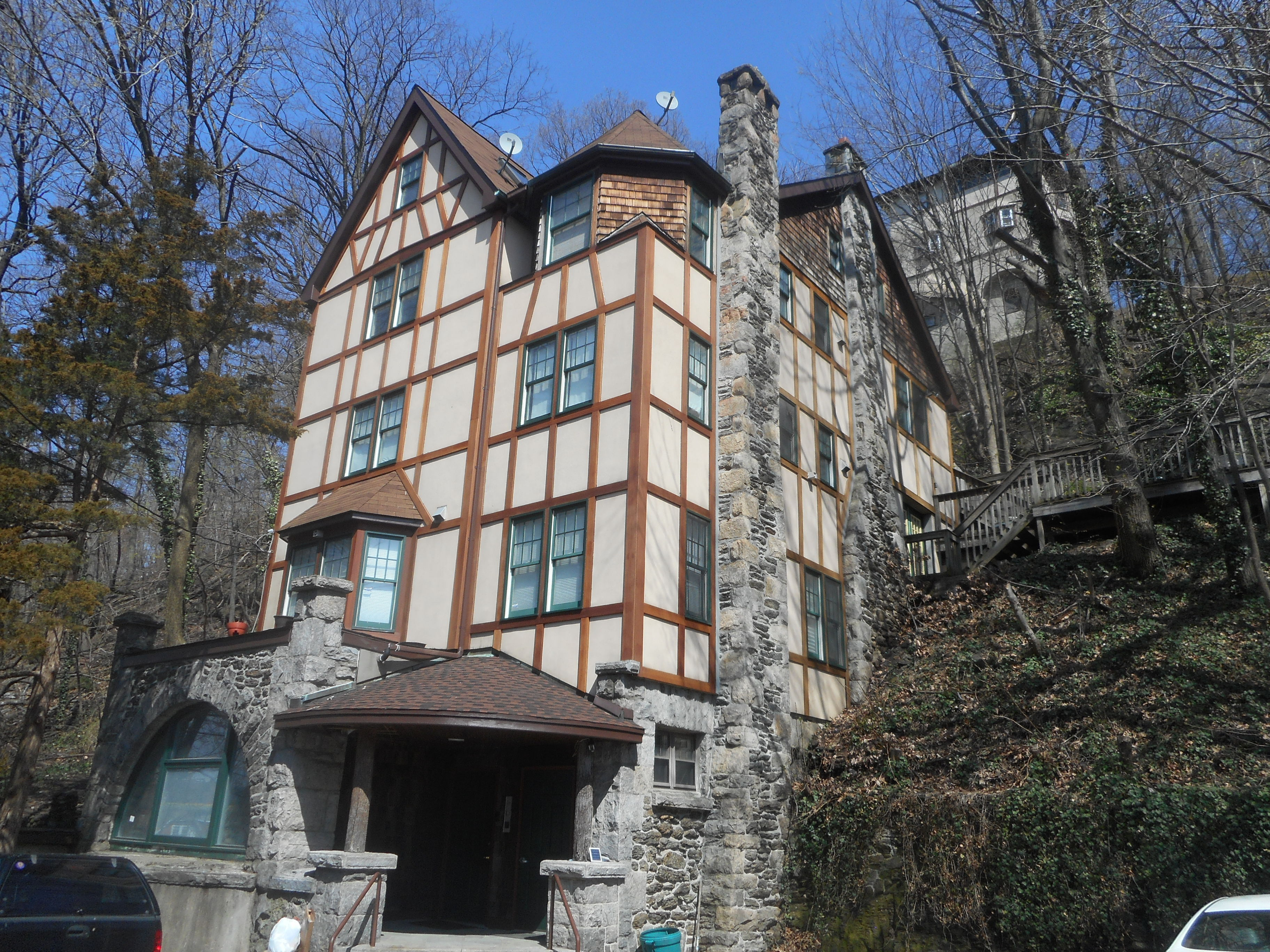
Lower station house of the Park Hill Incline Railway, Yonkers, New York.

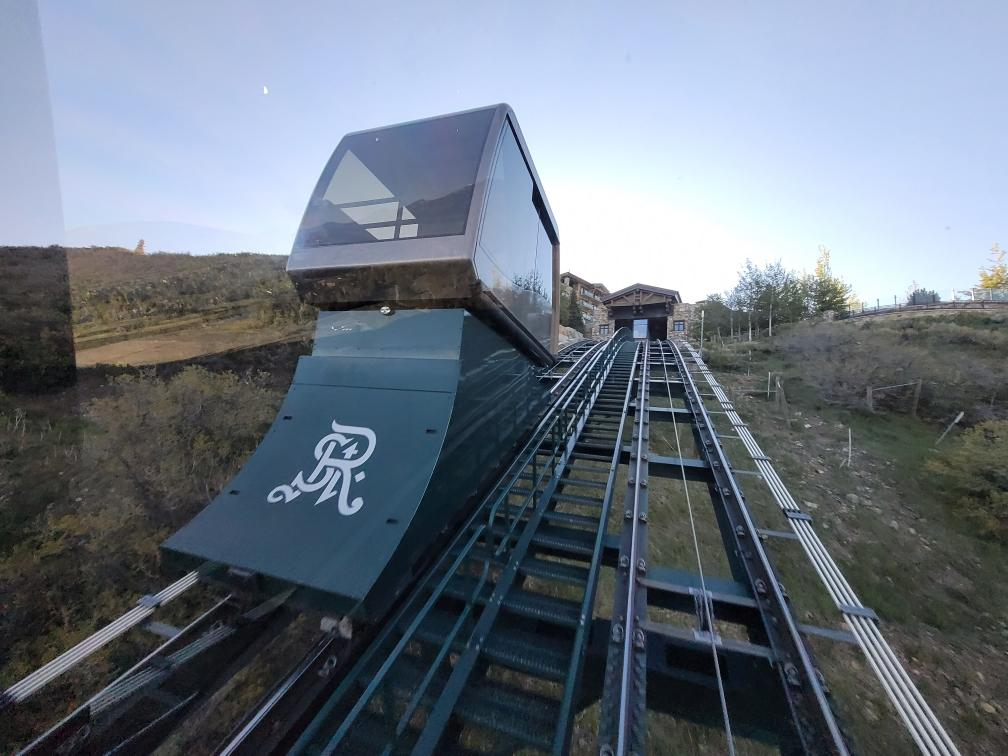
The St. Regis Funicular, St. Regis Deer Valley, Park City, Utah.

State	Location		Name of system	Date opened	Date closed	Notes
Arkansas	Marble Falls		Dogpatch Funicular Tram	1971	1993	
California	Capitola		Shadowbrook	1958		Single car incline used to access a unique riverfront restaurant that's been in business since 1947.
California	Fairfax			1913	1929	
California	Feather River Canyon					Bucks Creek Powerhouse, single car incline used for inspection of water system, later abandoned. Rails still visible on canyon walls.
California	Industry		Pacific Palms Resort, Industry Hills Golf Club funicular	1979		Later closed for maintenance
California	Santa Catalina Island		Island Mountain Railway	1904 1921	1918 1923	
California	Valencia		Six Flags Magic Mountain funicular			Honda Express, (original name: Funicular)
California	Los Angeles	Bunker Hill	Angels Flight	1901; reopened several times	1969 –	Moved and re-opened 1996, closed 2001, re-opened 2010, closed 2013, re-opened in 2017
California	Los Angeles	Los Angeles	Court Flight	1904	1943	Operated from 1904 to 1943 damaged by fire; razed 1944; site of Court of Flags.
California	Los Angeles		Mt. Washington Railway	1909	1919	Operated in the Highland Park/Mt. Washington neighborhood of L.A., ticket office and powerhouse still exist.
California	Los Angeles	Playa del Rey		1901	1909	Two cars ran in a counterbalance configuration from a Los Angeles Pacific Railway stop at the base of the Westchester cliffs to a hotel at the top of the bluff. Legend has it that the two cars were named 'Alphonse' and 'Gaston'.
California	San Francisco		Fillmore Counterbalance	1895	1941	
California	San Francisco	Telegraph Hill	Telegraph Hill funicular	1884	1886	Telegraph hill funicular to the observatory at the summit operated on Greenwich Street between 1884 and 1886.
California	San Francisco	Las Casitas Tram, San Francisco	Las Casitas funicular			Las Casitas Tram, San Francisco funicular serving a private home on Bay Street. Still in operation
Colorado	Cañon City		Royal Gorge Incline	1931	2013	
Colorado	Golden		Lookout Mountain	1912	1920	
Colorado	Golden		South Table Mountain	1912–	1920	
Colorado	Manitou Springs		Manitou Incline	1907	1990	
Colorado	Morrison		Red Rocks Amphitheatre, Mount Morrison Cable Incline	1909	1914	
Iowa	Dubuque		Fenelon Place Elevator Fourth Street Elevator	1882		Still operational
Iowa	Dubuque		Eleventh Street Elevator		Closed	
Massachusetts	Hadley		Mount Holyoke Railroad	1854	1938	
Massachusetts	Holyoke		Mount Tom Railroad	1897	1938	
Michigan	Kalamazoo		Western State Normal Railroad	1908	1949	
Minnesota	Duluth		7th Avenue West Incline Railway	1891	1939	
Minnesota	Duluth		Duluth Belt Line Railway (in West Duluth)	1889	1916	
Missouri	Branson		Marvel Cave, Silver Dollar City	1957		218 feet (66 m) long, 500 feet (152.4 m) rise, Curved. (still operational)
New Jersey	Hoboken		Hoboken Elevated Wagon Lift	1873	1949	
New Jersey	Orange		Orange Mountain Cable Railway	1893	1902	
New Jersey	Weehawken		Eldorado Elevator		(Closed)	
New Jersey	Weehawken		Weehawken Elevated Wagon Lift	1873	(Closed)	
New York	Beacon		Mount Beacon Incline Railway	1902 1975	1972 1978	
New York	Lake George		Prospect Mountain Cable Incline Railway	1895	1903	
New York	Niagara Falls		Prospect Park Incline Railway	1847	1907	
New York	Palenville		Otis Elevating Railway	1892	1918	
New York	Sea Cliff		Sea Cliff Incline	1886	After 1907	
New York	Yonkers		Park Hill Incline	1894	1937	
New York	Yonkers		Ridge Hill Incline			Yonkers other funicular to the Sprain Ridge Hospital Campus.
North Carolina	Fontana Dam		Fontana Dam incline tram	1942	1945	Fontana Dam turbine hall access on the east side of the Little Tennessee River (technically not a funicular, but an inclined railway a single car with a balance sled which rolls on tracks underneath the cab). No longer operational.
North Carolina	Maggie Valley		Ghost Town in the Sky	1961 2007	2002 2009	
Ohio	Cincinnati		Bellevue Incline	1876	1926	
Ohio	Cincinnati		Fairview Incline	1892	1923	
Ohio	Cincinnati		Mount Adams Incline	1874	1948	
Ohio	Cincinnati		Mount Auburn Incline	1872	1898	
Ohio	Cincinnati		Price Hill Incline	1874	1943	
Pennsylvania	Altoona		Horseshoe Curve funicular	1851		Still operational
Pennsylvania	Ashley		Ashley Planes	1837	1948	
Pennsylvania	Beaver Falls		Patterson Heights Incline	1895	1927	
Pennsylvania	Johnstown		Johnstown Inclined Plane	1891		Still operational
Pennsylvania	Jim Thorpe		Mauch Chunk Switchback Railway	1847	1938	
Pennsylvania	Jim Thorpe		Mount Pisgah Plane	1845	1938	
Pennsylvania	Summit Hill		Mount Jefferson Plane			
Pennsylvania	Pittsburgh		Bellevue Incline	1887	1892	
Pennsylvania	Pittsburgh		Castle Shannon Incline	1890	1964	
Pennsylvania	Pittsburgh		Castle Shannon South Incline	1892	1914	
Pennsylvania	Pittsburgh		Clifton Incline	1889	1905	
Pennsylvania	Pittsburgh		Duquesne Incline	1877		Still operational
Pennsylvania	Pittsburgh		Fort Pitt Incline	1882	1900	
Pennsylvania	Pittsburgh		H.B. Hays and Brothers Coal Railroad	1877	(Closed)	Inclines on Becks Run and Streets Run
Pennsylvania	Pittsburgh		Knoxville Incline	1890	1960	
Pennsylvania	Pittsburgh		Monongahela Incline	1870		Still operational
Pennsylvania	Pittsburgh		Monongahela Freight Incline	1884	1935	
Pennsylvania	Pittsburgh		Mount Oliver Incline	1872	1951	
Pennsylvania	Pittsburgh		Norwood Incline	1901	1923	
Pennsylvania	Pittsburgh		Nunnery Hill Incline	1888	1895	
Pennsylvania	Pittsburgh		Penn Incline	1884	1953	
Pennsylvania	Pittsburgh		Pittsburgh and Castle Shannon Plane	bef.1871	c. 1912	
Pennsylvania	Pittsburgh		St. Clair Incline	1888	c. 1932	
Pennsylvania	Pittsburgh		Troy Hill Incline	1888	1898	
Pennsylvania	West Elizabeth		Walton's coal incline		(Closed)	
Pennsylvania	West Elizabeth		O'Neil and Company Incline		(Closed)	
Tennessee	Chattanooga		Lookout Mountain Incline Railway	1895		Still operational
Utah	Park City		The St. Regis Funicular	2009		Still operational, this is a pair of inclined lifts, not a funicular.
Virginia	Roanoke		Mill Mountain Incline	1910	1929	
Washington	Seattle		Queen Anne Counterbalance	1901	1940	
Wisconsin	Milwaukee		Villa Terrace Decorative Arts Museum	1923	(Closed)	This is an inclined lift, not a funicular

== Asia ==
=== Azerbaijan ===
Location	Name of system	Date opened	Date closed	Notes
Baku	Baku Funicular	1960 re-opened 2001	(late 1980s)	

=== China ===
Region	Location	Name of system	Date opened	Date closed	Notes
Anhui	Huangshan	Huangshan funicular			
Chongqing	Changshou	Changshou funicular	1964		
Chongqing	Yuzhong	Wanglongmen funicular	1945	1993	
Chongqing	Yuzhong	Caiyuanba funicular	1953	1996	
Chongqing	Yuzhong	Chaotianmen funicular	1983 (2019 Planned reopening)	2007	
Jiangxi	Jiujiang	Lushan – Sandiequan funicular			
Shanxi	Taiyuan	Ximingkuang Cable Car (西铭矿缆车)			

=== Hong Kong ===
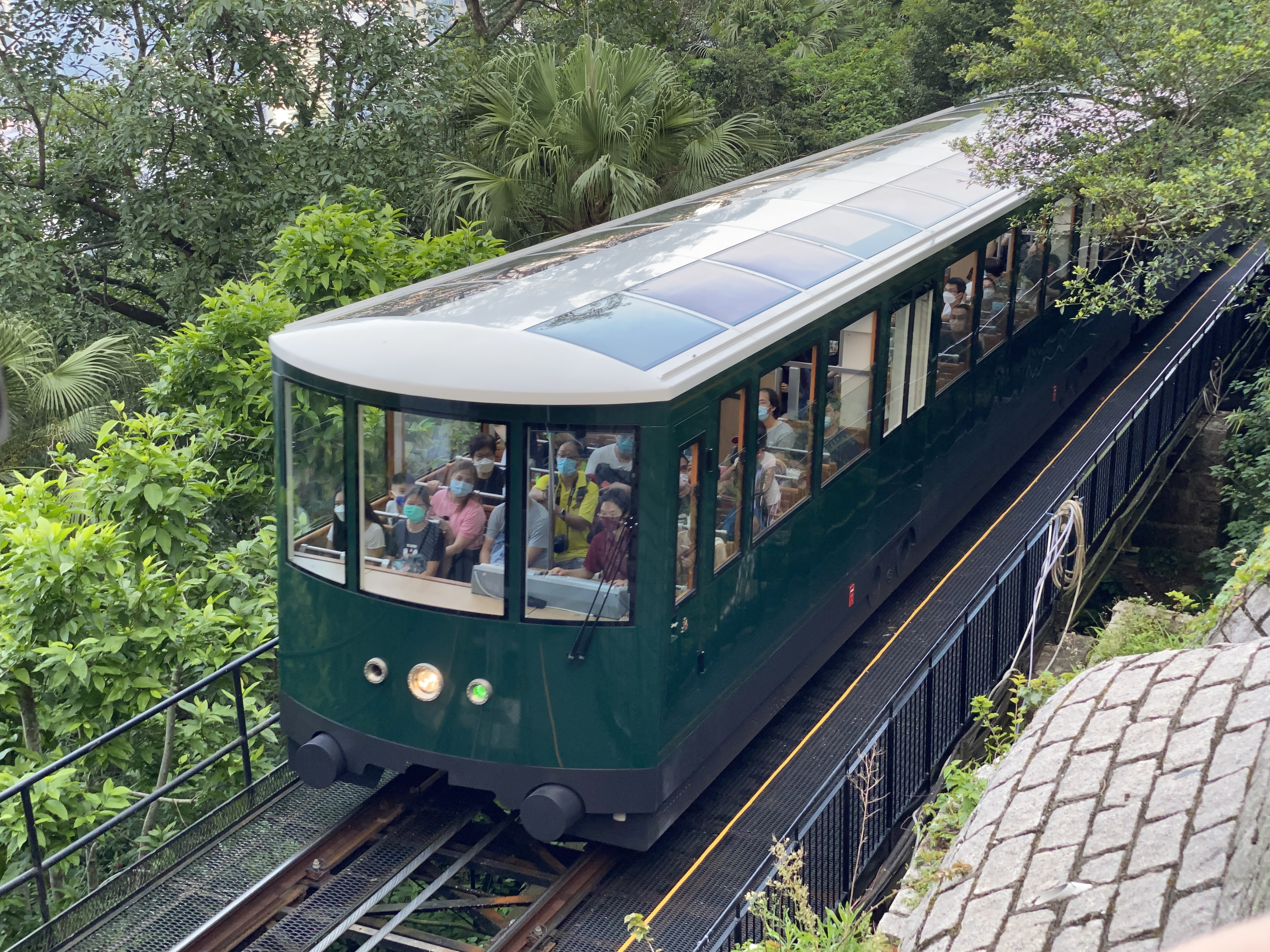
Peak Tram in Hong Kong

Location	Name of system	Date opened	Date closed	Notes
Victoria Peak	Peak Tram	1888		
Ocean Park	Ocean Express	2009		
Sha Tin	Po Fook Hill Elevator			
Lantau Island	Discovery Bay Elevator			

=== India ===
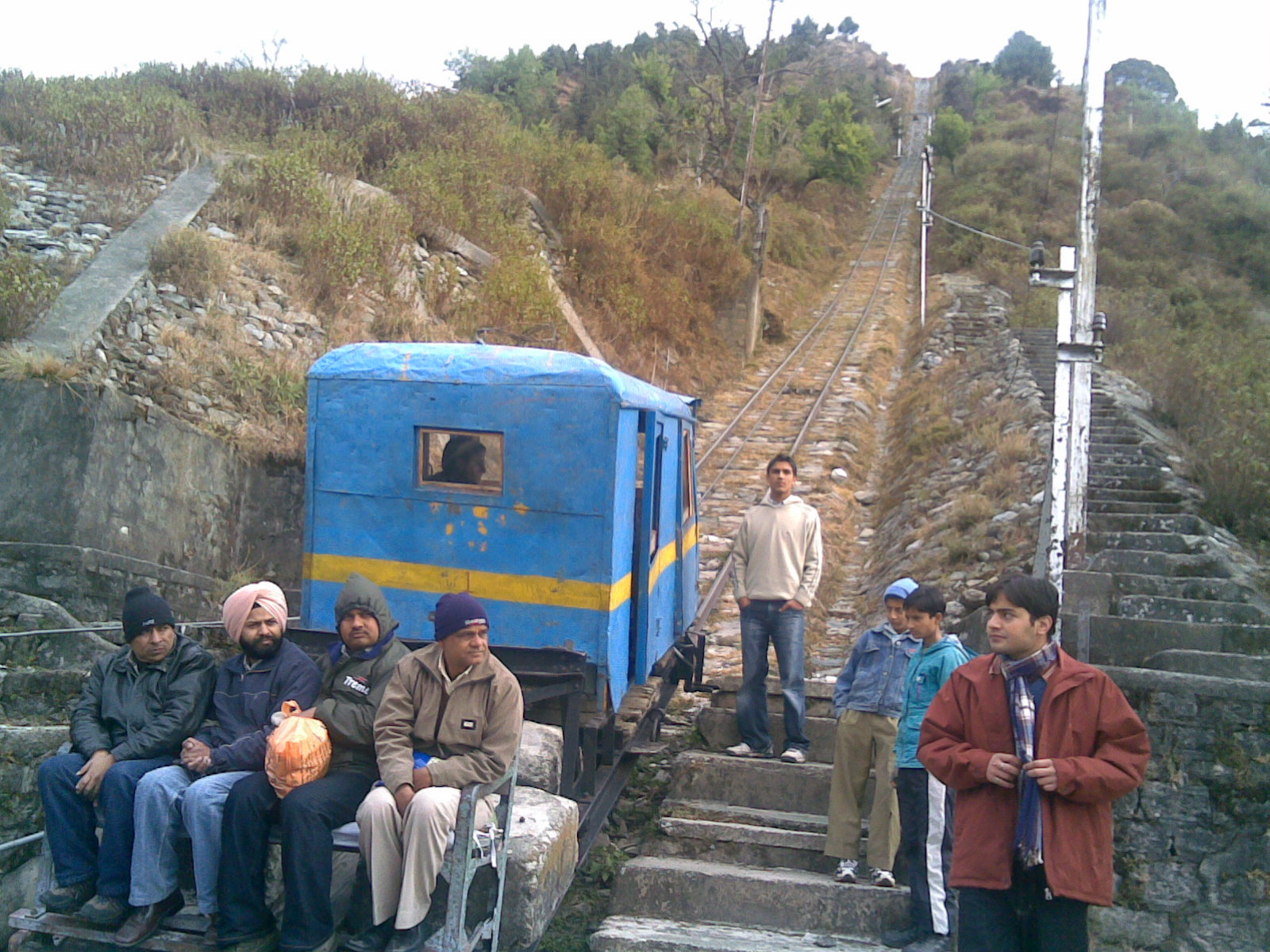
Haulage in Joginder Nagar

State	Location	Name of system	Date opened	Date closed	Notes
Himachal Pradesh	Jogindernagar	Shanan Power House	1930s		India's highest funicular at 2530 metres (8300 feet) elevation above sea level. It was built in the 1930s to carry heavy machinery of Shanan Power House to Barot. It is on one meter gauge. It is a 4-stage network of funicular and horizontal track and has six haulage car stations. The loading capacity of haulage way cars are 15, 10, 5 tons. Higher the capacity, lower the speed.
Maharashtra	Bhira Kheri	Bhivpuri Road			The Tata Group operates funicular railways.
Maharashtra	Saptashrungi	Nashik Temple	2018		
Maharashtra	Virar	Jivdani Mata Temple			
Maharashtra	Thane	Shri Malanggad	18 January 2026		India’s Longest Funicular Railway
Tamil Nadu	Dhandayuthapani Swamy Temple	Palani Temple Funicular			

=== Israel ===
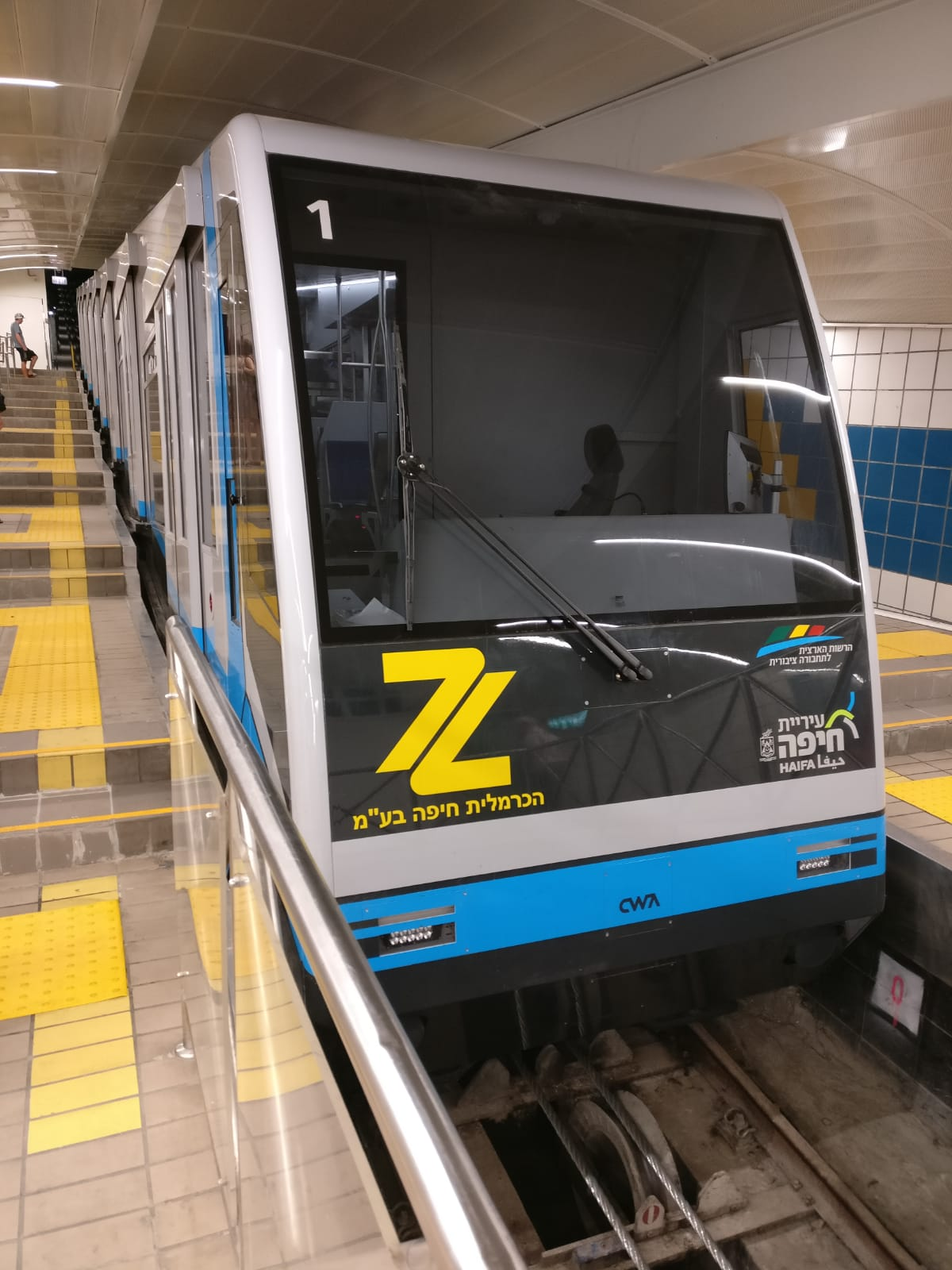
Carmelit underground funicular

Location	Name of system	Date opened	Date closed	Notes
Haifa	Carmelit	1959 re-opened 1992, 2018	1986 re-closed 2017	

=== Japan ===
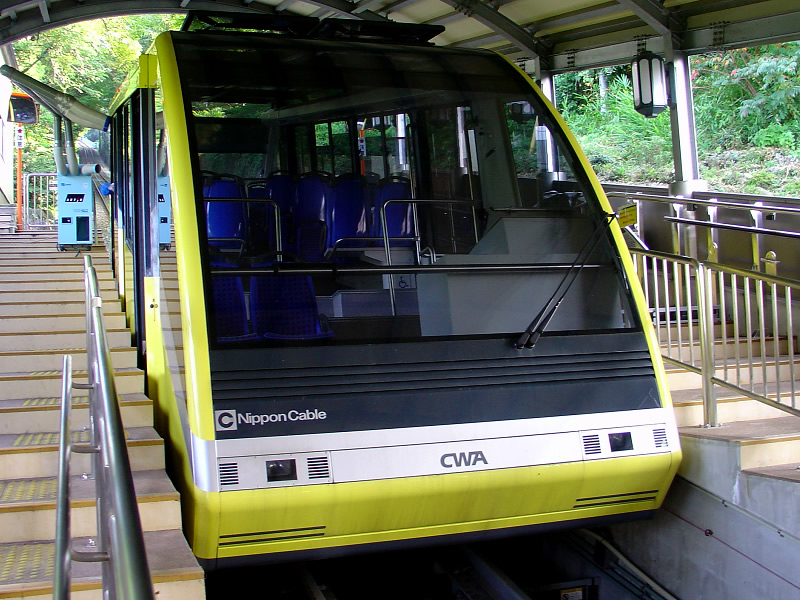
Car of the Hobashira Cable

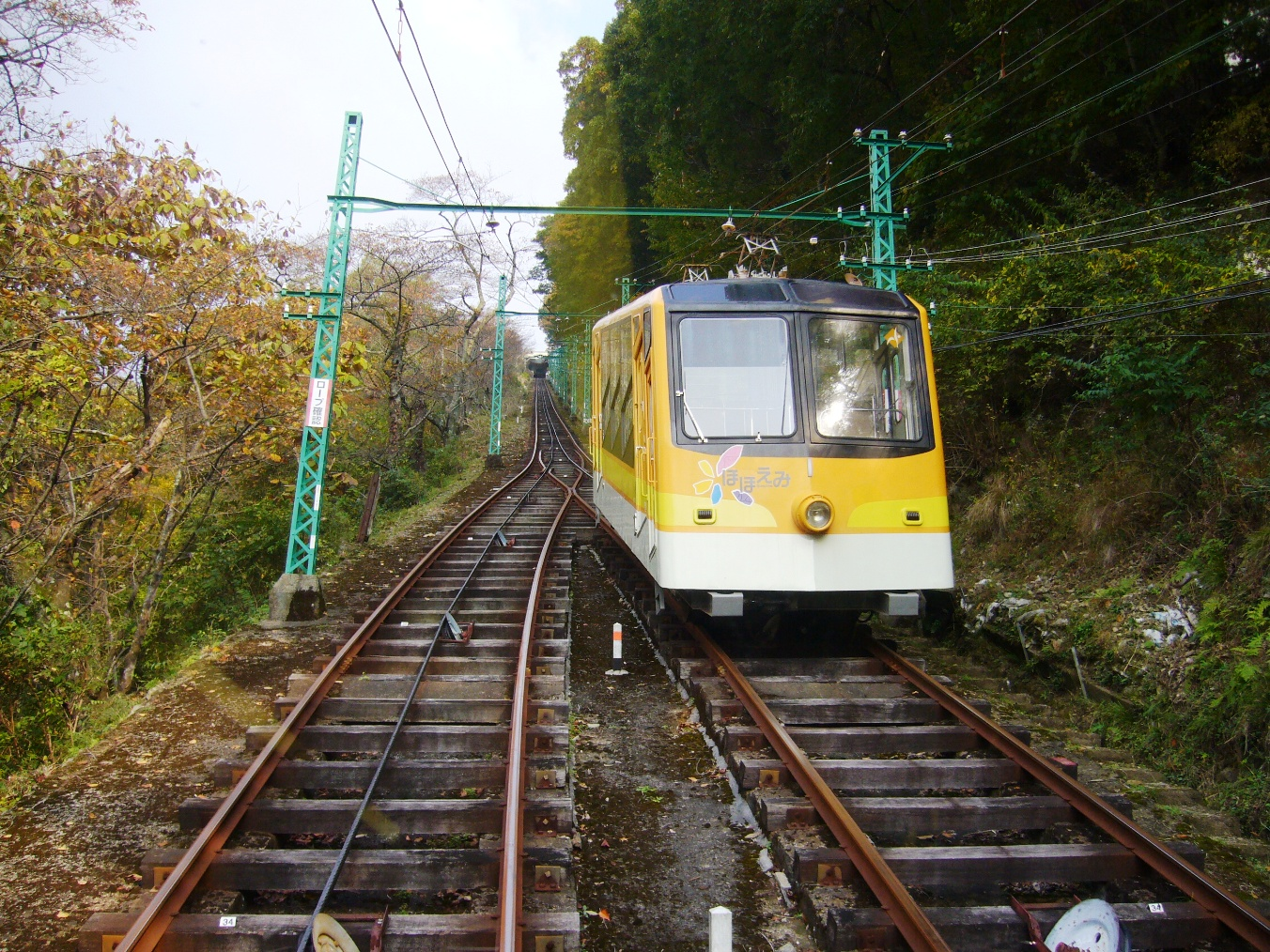
Car of the Myoken Cable at the passing loop

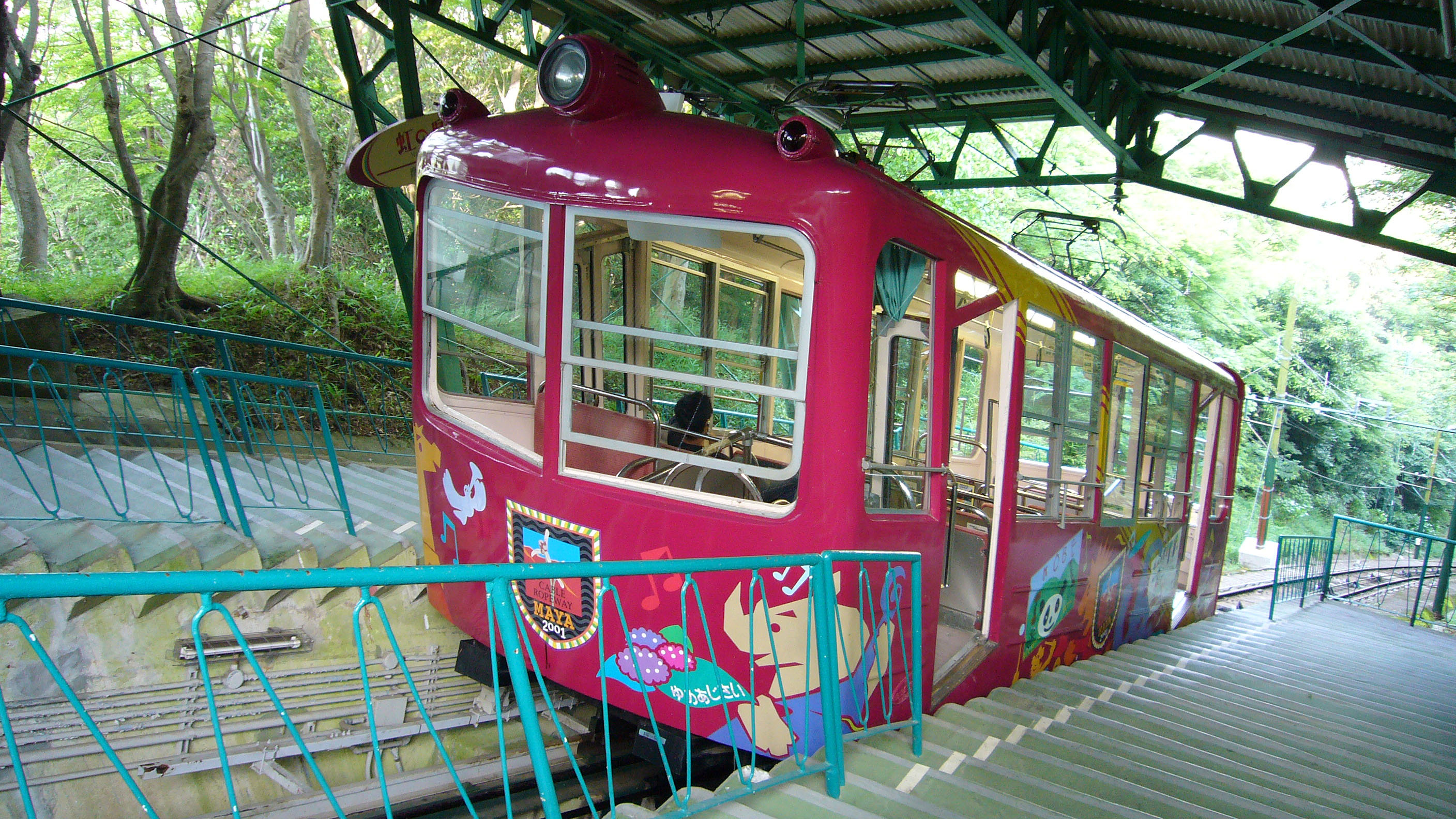
Maya Cablecar car

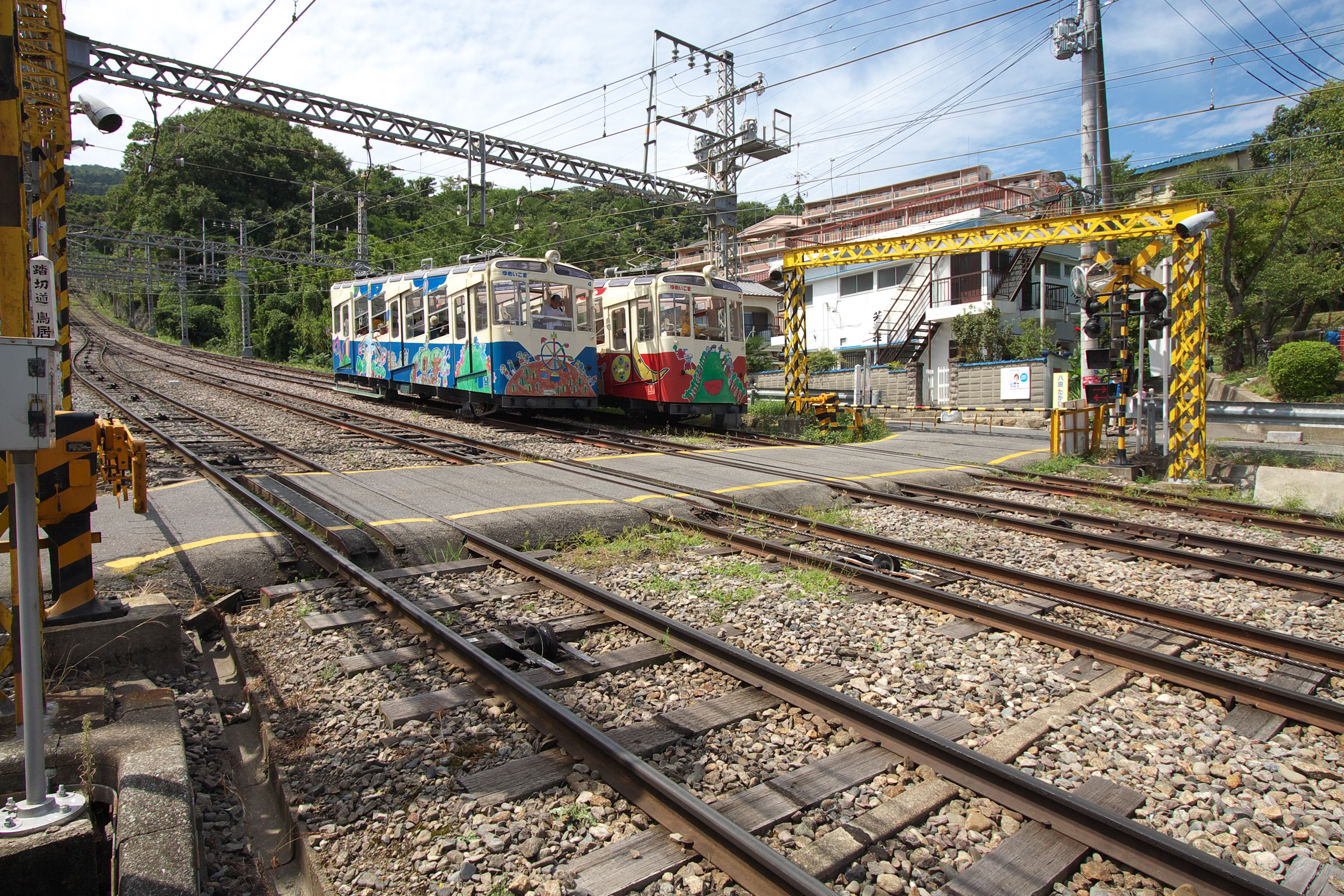
Twin passing loops on the Ikoma Cable line

Prefecture	Location	Name of system	Date opened	Date closed	Notes
Aomori	Sotogahama	Seikan Tunnel Tappi Shakō Line	1988		Seikan Tunnel Museum
Fukuoka	Kitakyushu	Sarakurayama Cable Car	1957		Sarakurayama Tozan Railway
Hyōgo	Kawanishi	Myoken Cable	1925 re-opened 1960	1944 re-closed 2023	Nose Electric Railway
Hyōgo	Kobe	Maya Cablecar	1925		Kobe Future City
Hyōgo	Kobe	Rokko Cable Line	1932		Rokko Maya Railway
Ibaraki	Tsukuba	Mount Tsukuba Cable Car	1925		Tsukuba Kanko Railway
Kagawa	Takamatsu	Yakuri Cable	1931		Shikoku Cable
Kanagawa	Hakone	Hakone Tozan Cable Car	1922		Odakyu Hakone
Kanagawa	Isehara	Ōyama Cable Car	1931		Oyama Kanko Dentetsu
Kyoto	Kyoto	Eizan Cable	1925		Keifuku Electric Railroad
Kyoto	Kyoto	Kurama-dera Cable	1957		Kurama-dera
Kyoto	Miyazu	Amanohashidate Cable Car	1927		Tango Kairiku Kotsu
Kyoto	Yawata	Otokoyama Cable	1926		Keihan Electric Railway
Nara	Ikoma	Ikoma Cable Line	1918		Kintetsu Railway
Ōita	Beppu	Beppu Rakutenchi Cable Line	1929		Okamoto MFG
Osaka	Yao	Nishi-Shigi Cable Line	1930 re-opened 1957	1944	Kintetsu Railway
Tokyo	Hachiōji	Takao Tozan Cable	1921		Takaotozan Railway
Tokyo	Ōme	Mitake Tozan Cable	1935		Mitake Tozan Railway
Toyama	Tateyama	Kurobe Cable Car	1969		Tateyama Kurobe Alpine Route
Toyama	Tateyama	Tateyama Cable Car	1954		Tateyama Kurobe Alpine Route
Shiga	Ōtsu	Sakamoto Cable	1927		Hieizan Railway
Shizuoka	Kannami	Jukkokutōge Cable Car	1956		Izuhakone Railway
Wakayama	Kōya	Kōyasan Cable	1930		Nankai Electric Railway

=== Lebanon ===
Location	Name of system	Date opened	Date closed	Notes
Harissa	Funiculaire de Harissa	1965		

=== Malaysia ===
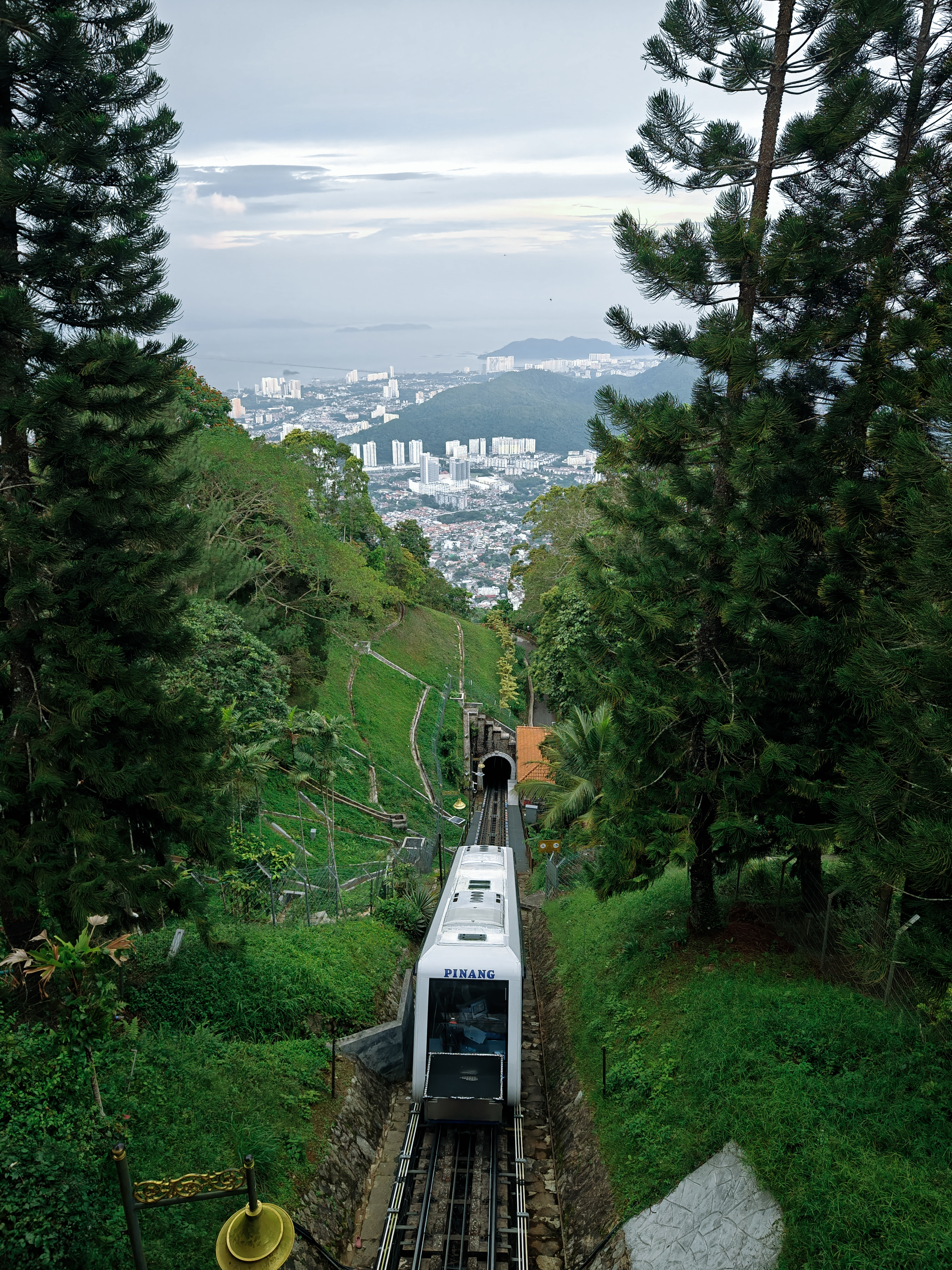
Penang Hill Railway

Region	Location	Name of system	Date opened	Date closed	Notes
Penang	Penang Hill	Penang Hill Railway	1923 re-opened 2011	2010	2010 with 2 independent sections; re-opened in 2011 as a one-section funicular

=== North Korea ===
Location	Name of system	Date opened	Date closed	Notes
Paektu Mountain	Paektu Mountain Funicular			

=== Philippines ===
Region	Location	Name of system	Date opened	Date closed	Notes
Cavite	Tagaytay	Tagaytay Highlands Funicular	1994		

=== South Korea ===
Location	Name of system	Date opened	Date closed	Notes
Samcheok	ChooChooPark			Incline Train

=== Russia ===
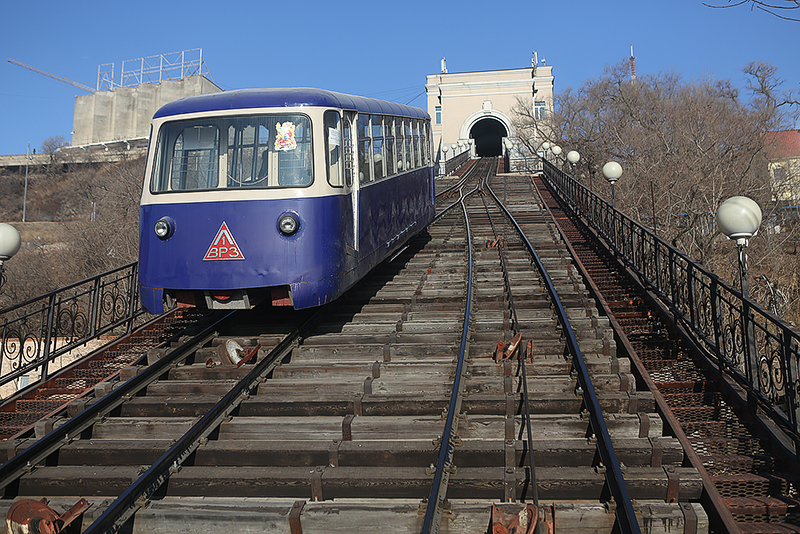
Vladivostok funicular

(Russia is a transcontinental country spanning Europe and Asia. The funicular railway below is on the East Asian side, so is listed here.) (See: Europe/Russia section)

Location	Name of system	Date opened	Date closed	Notes
Vladivostok	Vladivostok Funicular	1934		

=== Thailand ===
Location	Name of system	Date opened	Date closed	Notes
Phetchaburi	Khao Wang			

=== Turkey ===
Turkey is in both Europe and Asia. The border between the two continents is the Bosphorus Strait. All the funicular railways in Turkey are on the European side of the Bosphorus Strait so they are listed under Europe. (See: Europe/Turkey section)

=== Vietnam ===
Location	Name of system	Date opened	Date closed	Notes
Danang	Ba Na Hills			
Fansipan	Mường Hoa and Fansipan Peak Funiculars	31 March 2018		Two separate funicular railways connected in the middle by a cable car.

== Europe ==
=== Austria ===
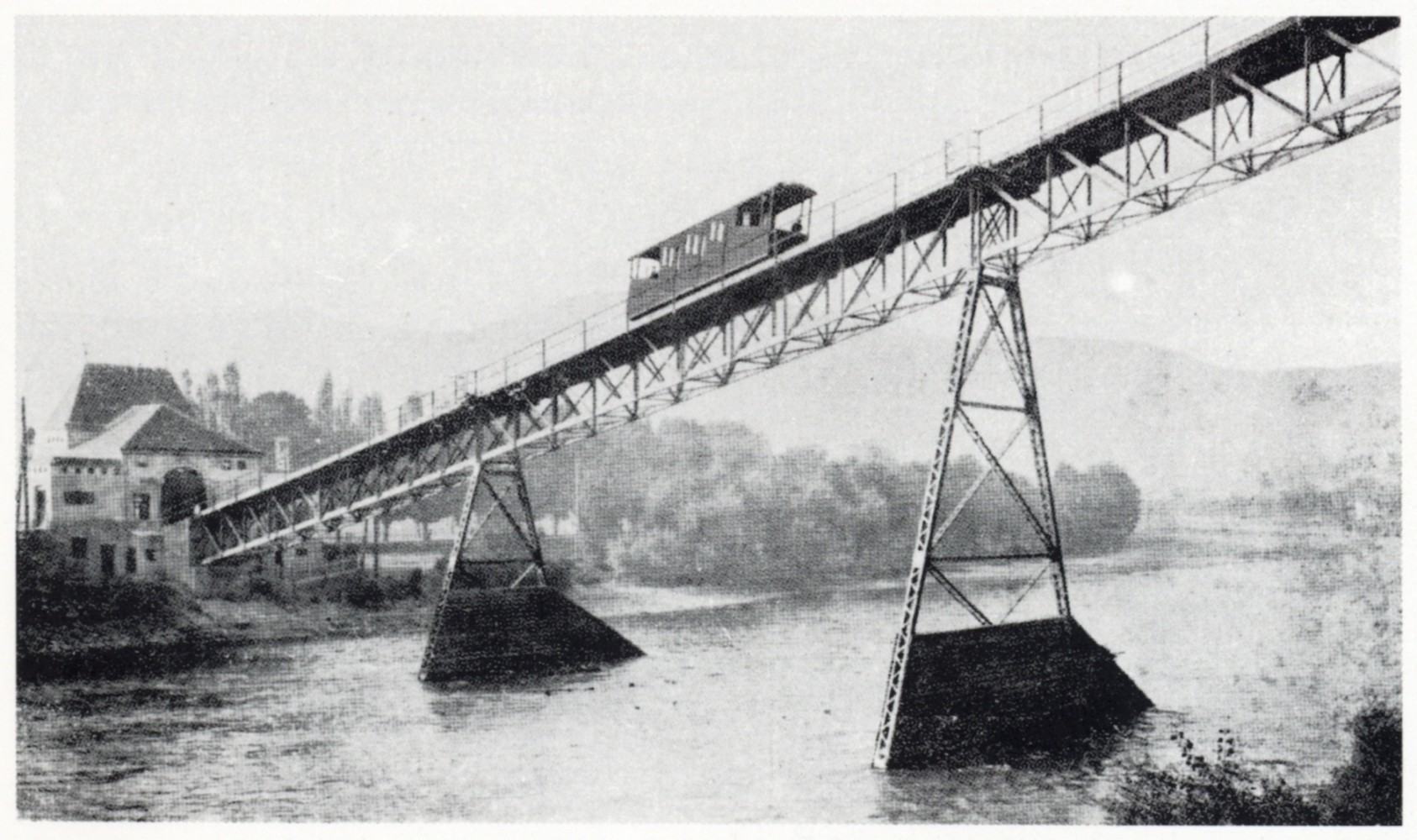
Hungerburgbahn crossing the river Inn, about 1907

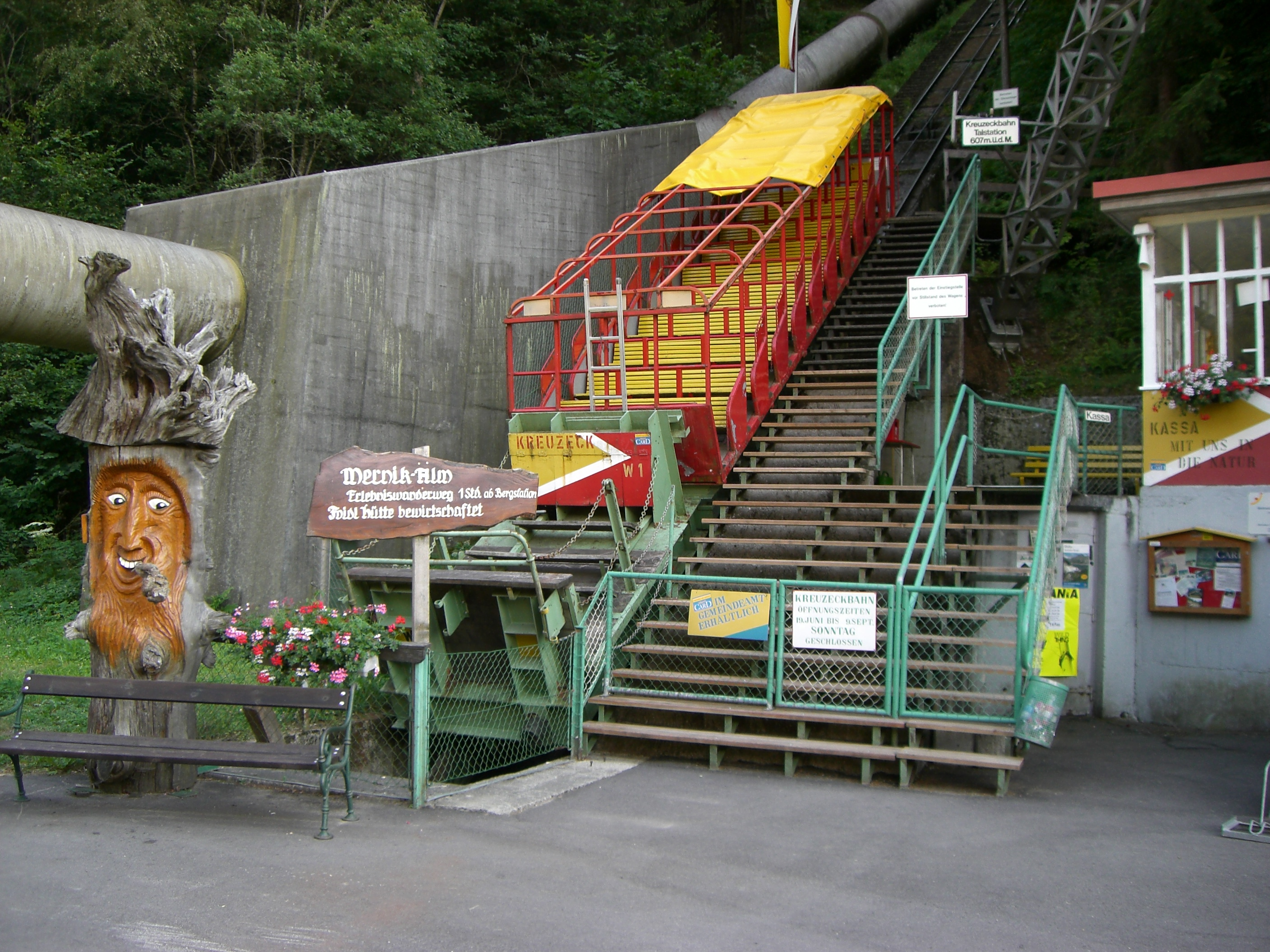
Kreuzeckbahn

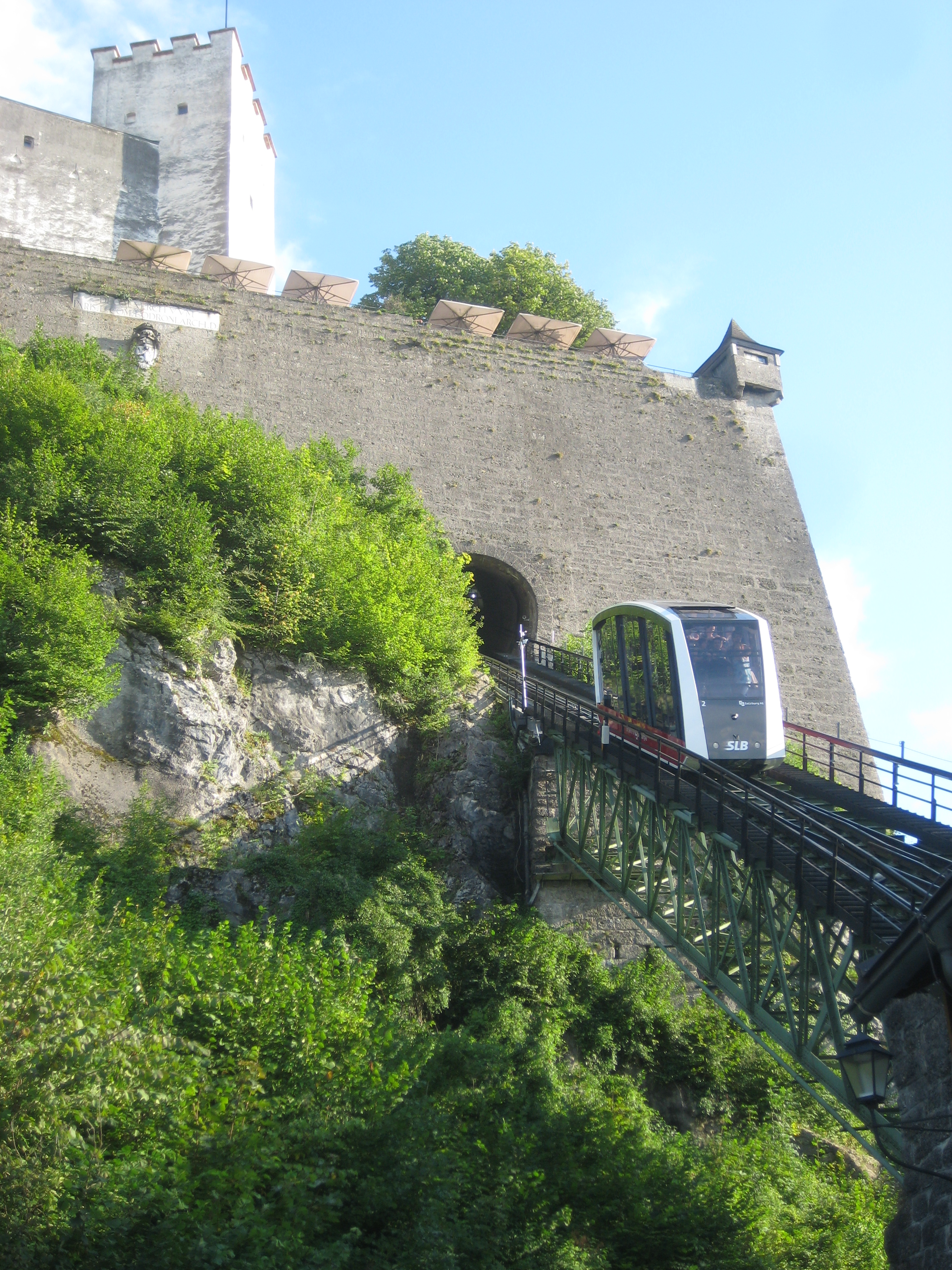
Festungsbahn (Salzburg)

Location	Name of system	Date opened	Date closed	Notes
Axams	Olympiabahn (Axamer Lizum)	1975		
Bad Hofgastein	Schlossalmbahn	1964		Replaced by monocable gondola 2018
Ellmau	Hartkaiserbahn	1972		Replaced by monocable gondola in 2015
Graz	Schlossbergbahn	1894		
Großglockner	Großglockner Gletscherbahn	1963		
Hallstatt	Salzbergbahn	1952		
Innerfragant, Salzburg	Gletscherexpress (Mölltaler Gletscher)	1997		
Innsbruck	Hungerburgbahn	1907 Replaced 2005		
Innsbruck	Bergisel Skisprung-Stadion	2002		
Kaprun	Gletscherbahn Kaprun 2	1974	2000	Site of the Kaprun disaster
Kaprun	Lärchwandschrägaufzug	1952		
Kaprun	Gletschershuttle	1990		
Kolbnitz, Reißeck	Kreuzeckbahn	1974		
Kolbnitz, Reißeck	Reisseck Railway	1908	2022	Closed for public transport
Kufstein	Festungsbahn	1999		
Reutte	Ehrenberg Liner	2019		
Sankt Leonhard im Pitztal	Pitzexpress	1983		
Salzburg	Reisszug	c.1500		
Salzburg	Festungsbahn	1892		
Seefeld in Tirol	Standseilbahn Rosshütte	1969		Rosshütte funicular
Serfaus	U-Bahn Serfaus	1985		
Spital am Pyhrn	Wurzeralmbahn	1978		
St. Anton am Arlberg	Kandaharbahn	1972		Replaced by monocable gondola Nassereinbahn in 2000
St. Johann in Tirol	Harschbichlbahn I & II	Replaced 1987		
Zauchensee	Weltcupexpress	2000		

=== Belgium ===
Location	Name of system	Date opened	Date closed	Notes
Spa	Funiculaire de Spa	2004		

=== Bosnia and Herzegovina ===
Location	Name of system	Date opened	Date closed	Notes
Sarajevo	Kosi lift ciglane			

=== Bulgaria ===
Location	Name of system	Date opened	Date closed	Notes
Veliko Tarnovo	Trapezitsa fortress	2014		
Belchin	Tsari Mali Grad fortress	2013		

=== Croatia ===
Location	Name of system	Date opened	Date closed	Notes
Zagreb	Funicular Xavier			
Zagreb	Zagreb Funicular	1890 1974	2025	Scheduled to reopen March 2026

=== Czech Republic ===
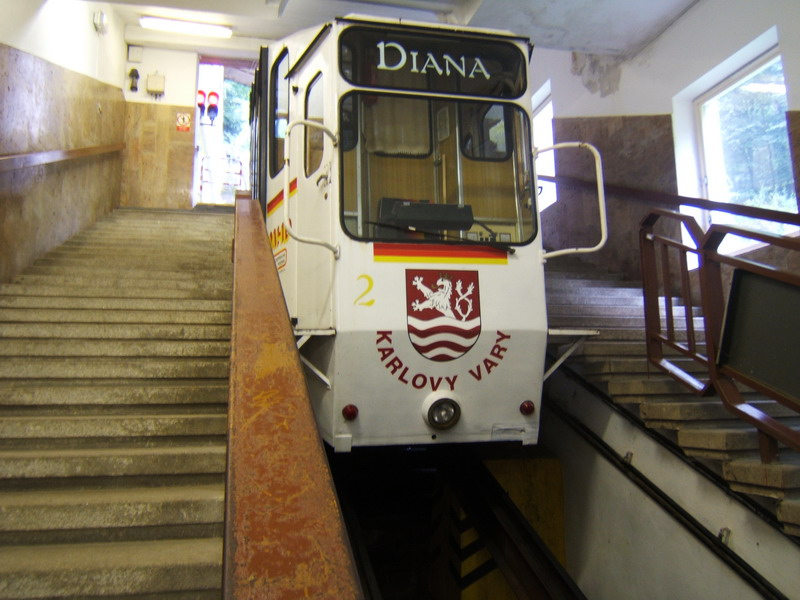
Diana Funicular in Karlovy Vary

Location	Name of system	Date opened	Date closed	Notes
Prague	Petřín funicular	1891		
Prague	Letná funicular	1891 1916	1922	Officially abolished in 1922, in 1926–1935 served as the first Prague escalator
Prague	NH Hotel Prague funicular	1996	2018	
Karlovy Vary	Diana Funicular	1912)		
Karlovy Vary	Imperial Funicular	1907		Subway
Karlovy Vary	Slovenská–Imperial Funicular	1912	1959	
Karlovy Vary	Tři kříže Funicular	1913		Dreikreuzberg, unfinished, the construction process began 1913 and was interrupted 1914 with World War I

=== Finland ===
Location	Name of system	Date opened	Date closed	Notes
Turku	Kakola Funicular	2019		

=== France ===
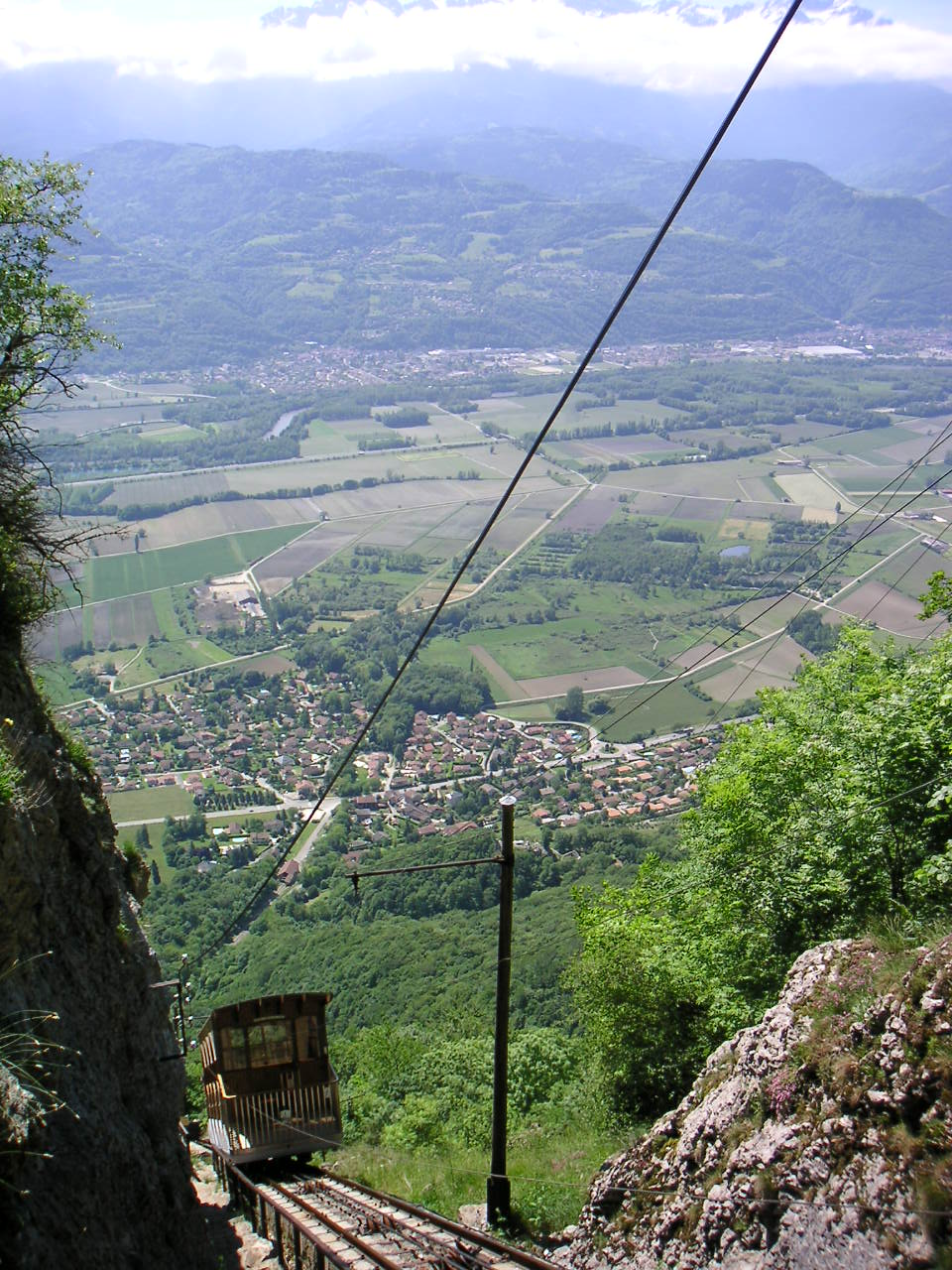
Funiculaire de Saint-Hilaire du Touvet

Location	Name of system	Date opened	Date closed	Notes
Arcachon	Arcachon Funicular	1913	1948	Replaced in 1949 by a vertical elevator
Les Arcs	Funiculaire Arc-en-ciel	1989		
Aven Armand	Aven Arman Funicular	1963		Tunnel funicular to provide access to the limestone cave
Bagnères-de-Luchon	La Chaumière Funicular	1894	1970	
Barèges	Funiculaire du pic de l'Ayré	1937	2000	
Besançon	Funiculaire de Beauregard-Bregille	1912	1987	
La Bourboule	La Bourboule Funicular	1902	1958	
Cannes	Super-Cannes Funicular	1928	1965	
Les Deux Alpes	Funiculaire Dôme Express	1989		
Évian-les-Bains	Évian-les-Bains Funicular	1913 re-opened 2002	1969	
Grasse	Grasse Funicular	1909	1938	
Grottes des Demoiselles	Grottes des Demoiselles Funicular	1931		Tunnel funicular to provide access to the limestone cave
Le Havre	Funiculaire du Havre	1890 re-opened 1950	1944	
Langres	Funiculaire Panoramique Sous-Bie			
Laon	Poma 2000	1989	2016	Rubber tyres automated guideway transit cable-driven people mover funicular
Lourdes	Funiculaire du Pic du Jer	1900		
Lyon	Croix-Paquet Funicular	1891	1972	Converted into Lyon Metro Line C from 1974.
Lyon	Rue Terme Funicular	1862	1967	Mainly in tunnel, converted into a road tunnel from 1968.
Lyon	Saint Jean – Saint Just	1878 1958		Saint Jean – Saint Just funicular from 1901 until 1958 converted into a rack railway, converted back to a funicular in 1958.
Lyon	Saint Jean – Fourvière Funicular	1900		
Lyon	Saint Paul – Fourvière Funicular	1900	1937	
Marseille	Notre-Dame-de-la-Garde Funicular	1892	1967	
Menton	l'Annonciade Funicular	1914	c.1939	
Meudon	Bellevue funicular	1893 re-opened 1922	1917 1934	
Mont-Dore	Funiculaire du Capucin	1898		
Nancy	Cure d'Air Funicular	1905	1914	
Nice	Cimiez Funicular	1906	c.1955	
Nice	Expo Internationale 1884 Funicular	1883	1884	Nice world's fair funicular
Nice	Zygofolis Funicular	1987	1991	Amusement park funicular
Paris	Montmartre Funicular	1900 1935	1931 1990	Converted into an inclined elevator from 1991.
Pau	Funiculaire de Pau	1908 re-opened 1978	1970	
Penly Nuclear Power Plant	Penly Funicular	1991		Private funicular to transport workers and professional visitors from car parc to power plant.
Rouen	Bonsecour Funicular	1892	1915	
Saint-Hilaire du Touvet	Funiculaire de Saint-Hilaire du Touvet	1924		
Thonon-les-Bains	Funiculaire de Thonon-les-Bains	1888		
Tignes	Funiculaire du Perce-Neige	1993		
Le Tréport	Le Tréport Funicular	1908	1941	Replaced by a gondola lift from 1958 until 1982 and by an inclined elevator from 2006.
Val-d'Isère	Funival	1988		

=== Georgia ===
Location	Name of system	Date opened	Date closed	Notes
Bakuriani	Kokhta rope-way	re-opened 2015	2007	Part of the ski resort Bakuriani
Tbilisi	Mtatsminda Park	1905 re-opened 2013	2000	Funicular to Mtatsminda Pantheon

=== Germany ===
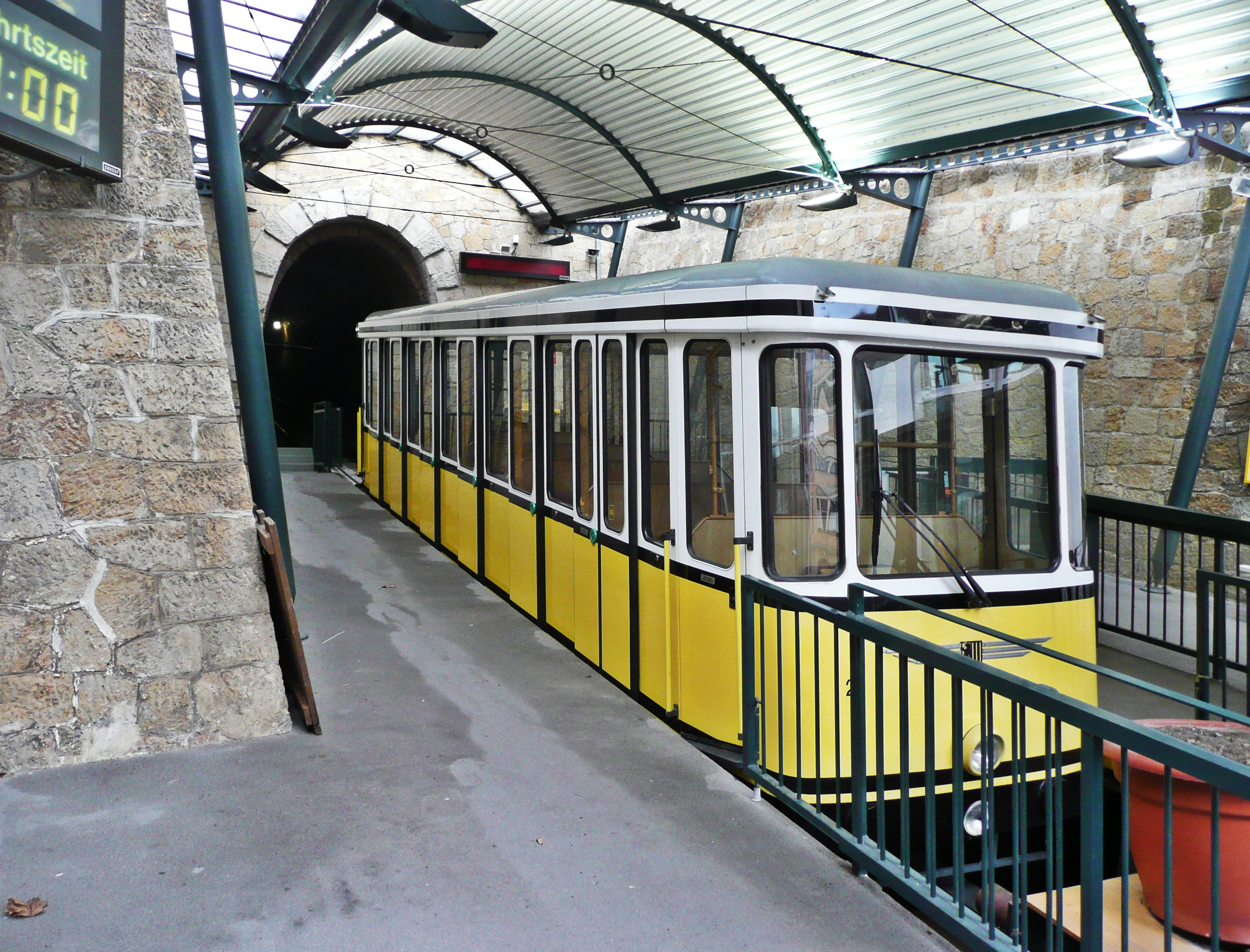
Standseilbahn Dresden

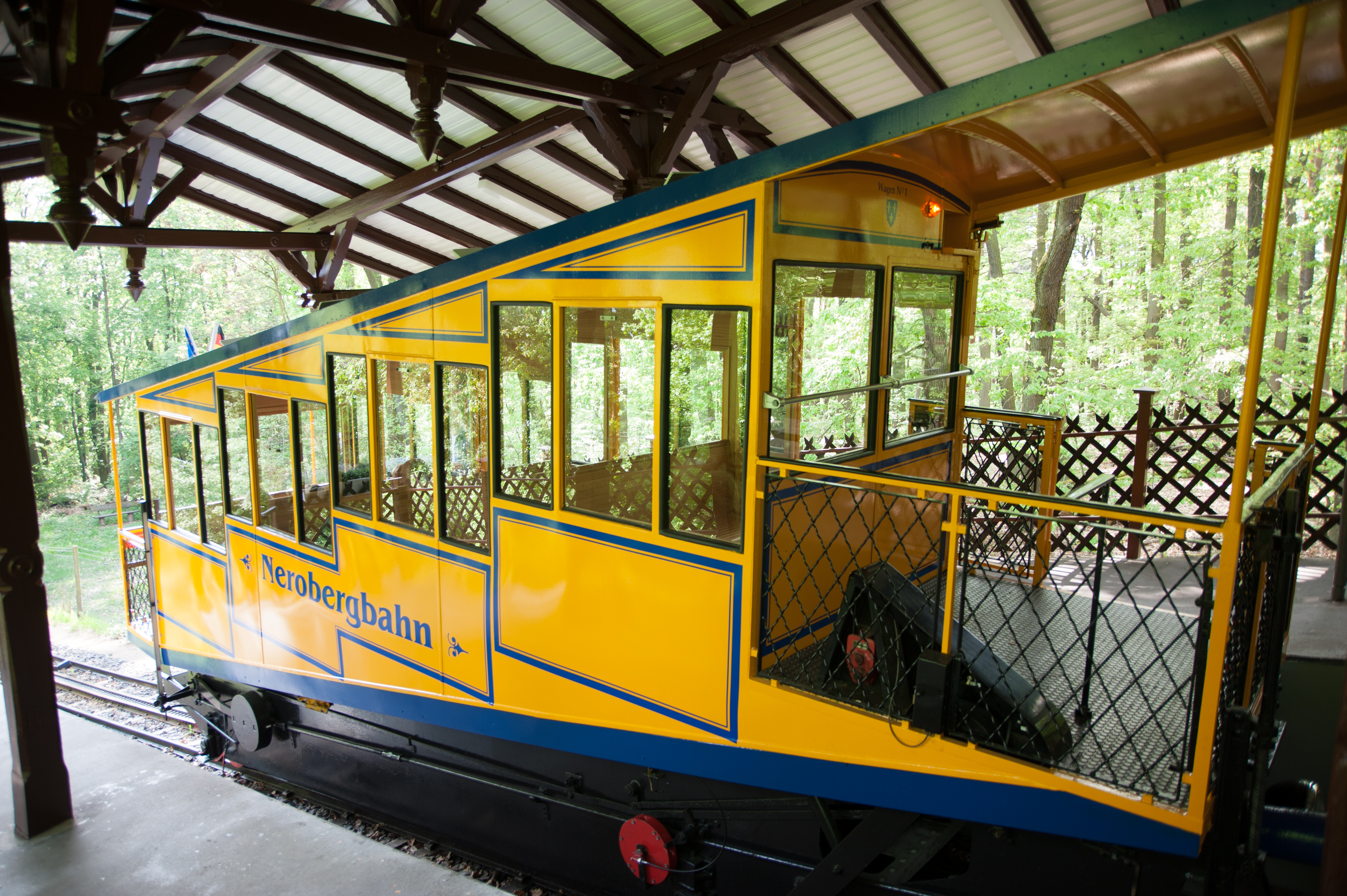
The Nerobergbahn

Location	Name of system	Date opened	Date closed	Notes
Andernach	Krahnenbergbahn	1895	1941	
Augustusburg	Augustusburg Cable Railway	1911		
Bad Ems	Kurwaldbahn	1979		
Bad Ems	Malbergbahn	1887	1979	
Bad Pyrmont	Bombergbahn	1895	1923	
Bad Wildbad	Sommerbergbahn	1908		
Baden-Baden	Merkur Funicular Railway	1913 re-opened 1979	1967	
Dresden	Dresden Suspension Railway	1901		
Dresden	Dresden Funicular Railway	1895		
Freiburg im Breisgau	Schlossbergbahn	2008		
Heidelberg	Heidelberger Bergbahn			
Hirschau	Monte Kaolino			
Hohenwarte	Standseilbahn Hohenwarte			
Karlsruhe	Turmbergbahn	1888	2024	
Koblenz	Rittersturzbahn	1928	1959	
Künzelsau	Künzelsauer Bergbahn	1999		
Oberstdorf	Schattbergsprungstadion			
Oberweißbach	Oberweißbacher Bergbahn	1922		
Peterskopf	Peterskopfbahn	1929		
Saarbrücken	Standseilbahn Eschberg	c.1870	1926	
Sellin	Sellin Pier Lift			
Straßberg	Standseilbahn Kaiseringen	1912	1921	Military funicular
Stuttgart	Standseilbahn Stuttgart	1929		
Bad Herrenalb	Falkenburgbahn			
Wiesbaden	Nerobergbahn	1888 re-opened 1948	1944	
Willingen	Standseilbahn Mühlenkopfschanze	2001		

=== Greece ===
Region	Location	Name of system	Date opened	Date closed	Notes
Athens	Mount Lycabettus	Lycabettus Funicular	1965		
Corfu	Giannades	Grand Mediterraneo Beach Resort Funicular			

=== Hungary ===
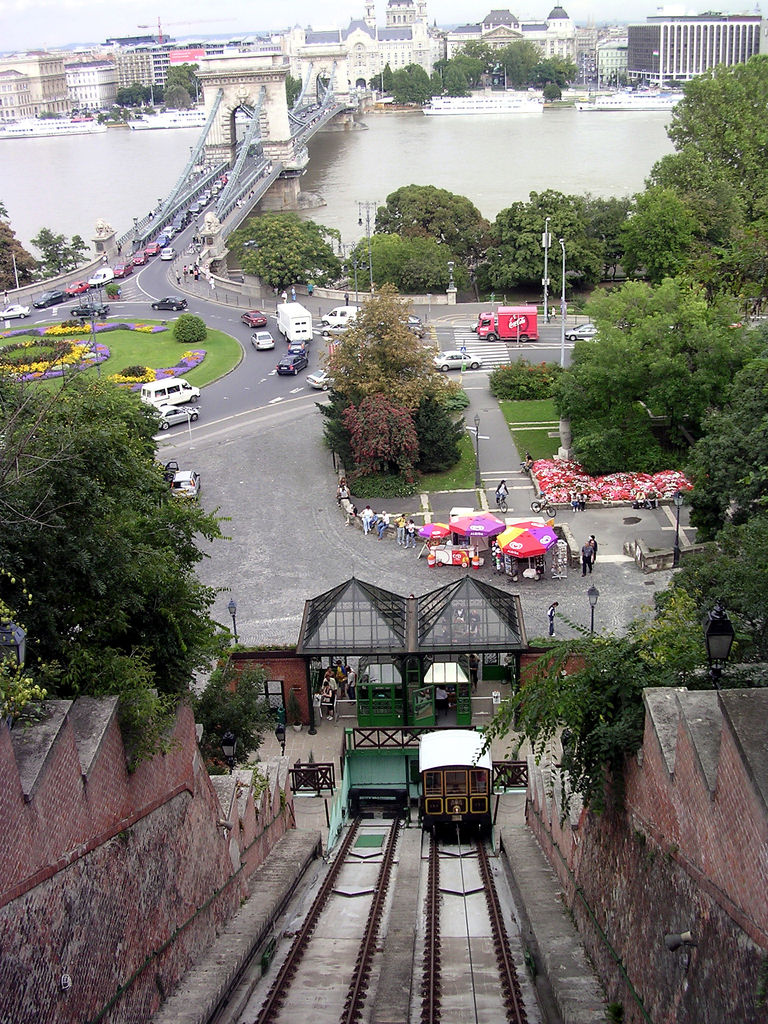
Budapest Castle Hill Funicular

Location	Name of system	Date opened	Date closed	Notes
Budapest	Castle Hill Funicular	1870		In 1944 destroyed, 1986 rebuilt

=== Italy ===
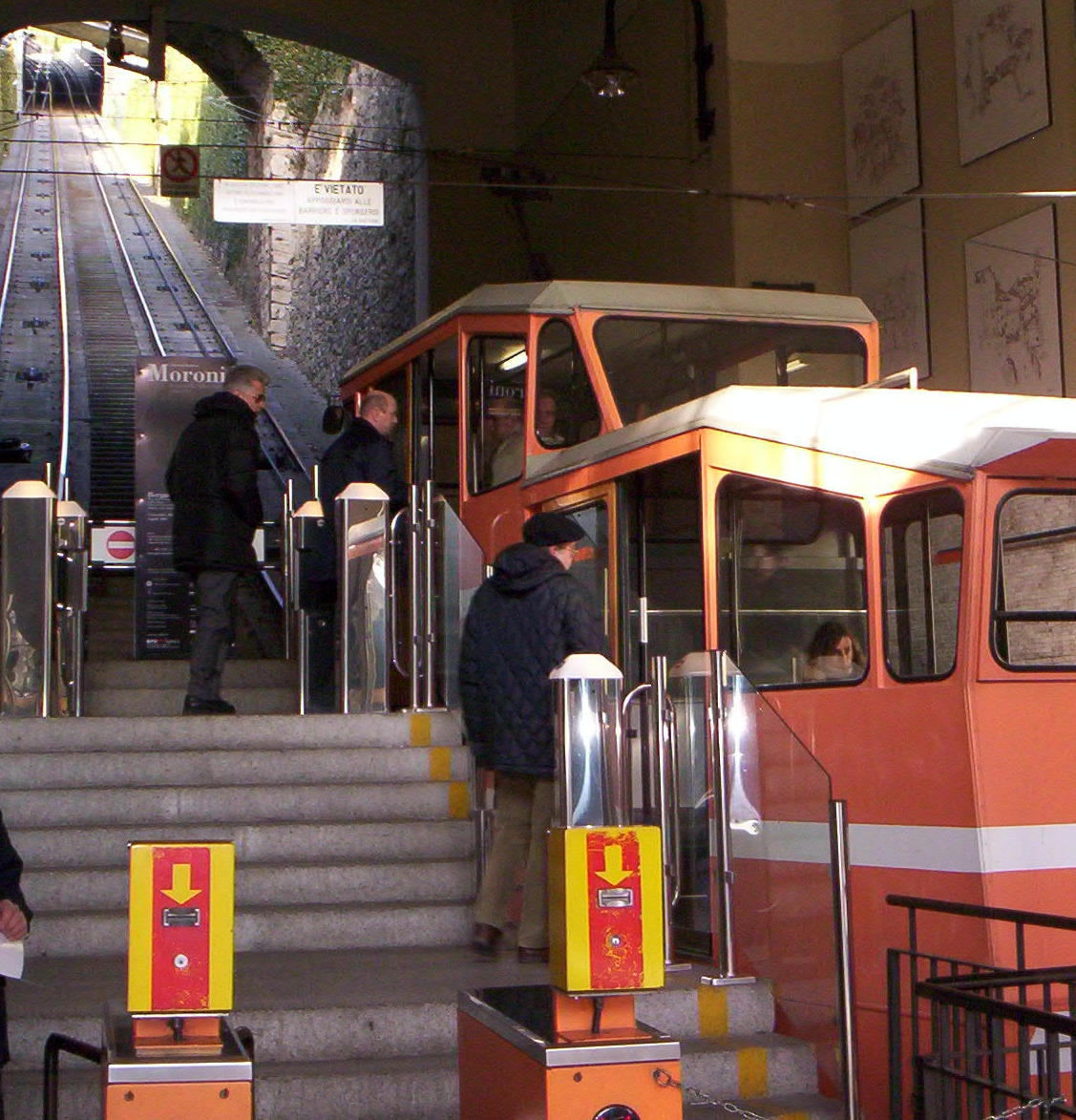
Bergamo Upper City funicular

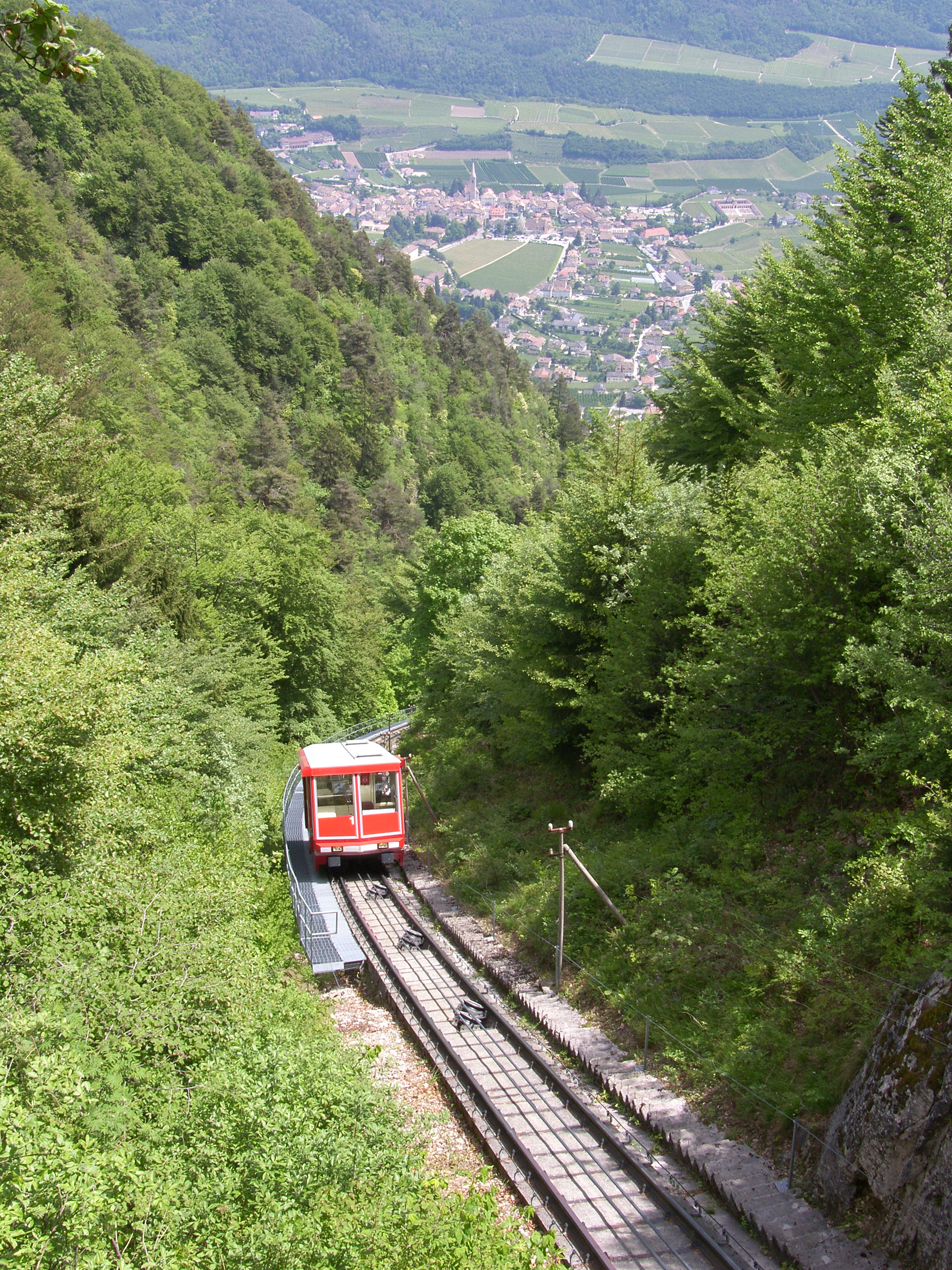
The Mendel Funicular

Location	Name of system	Date opened	Date closed	Notes
Arenzano	Arenzano Funicular			
Bergamo	Bergamo Upper City funicular	1887		
Bergamo	Bergamo – San Vigilio funicular	1912		
Biella	Biella funicular	1885		
Como	Como–Brunate funicular	1894		
Campodolcino	Campodolcino funicular	1996		
Capri	Capri funicular	1907		
Catanzaro	Catanzaro funicular	1998		
Certaldo	Certaldo funicular	1999		
Genoa	Quezzi inclined elevator	2015		
Genoa	Sant'Anna funicular	1891		
Genoa	Zecca–Righi funicular	1895		
Kaltern/Caldaro	Mendel funicular	1903		
Livorno	Montenero Funicular	1908		
Mondovì	Mondovì Funicular	1886 re-opened 2006	1975	
Montecatini Terme	Montecatini Terme funicular	1898		
Mercogliano	Montevergine funicular	1956		
Naples	Central funicular	1928		
Naples	Chiaia Funicular	1889		
Naples	Mergellina Funicular	1931		
Naples	Montesanto Funicular	1891		
Naples	Mount Vesuvius funicular	1880 1909	1906 1944	Closed due to the eruption of Mount Vesuvius in 1906, then closed in 1944 after it erupted again. Notable as the only funicular to operate on an active volcano, as well as for inspiring the song Funiculì, Funiculà.
Orvieto	Orvieto Funicular	1888		
San Pellegrino Terme	San Pellegrino funicular	1909	1988	
Santa Cristina Gherdëina	Gardena Ronda Express	2004		
Sorrento	Sorrento funicular	1893	1898	
Trieste	Trieste–Opicina tramway	1902		
Urtijëi	Resciesa funicular	2010		
Varese	Kursaal funicular	1911	1944	
Varese	Vellone–Campo dei Fiori funicular	1911	1953	
Varese	Vellone–Sacro Monte funicular	1909		
Verona	Verona funicular	1941 re-opened 2017	1944	

=== Kosovo ===
Location	Name of system	Date opened	Date closed	Notes
Brezovica	Brezovica Funicular			

=== Lithuania ===
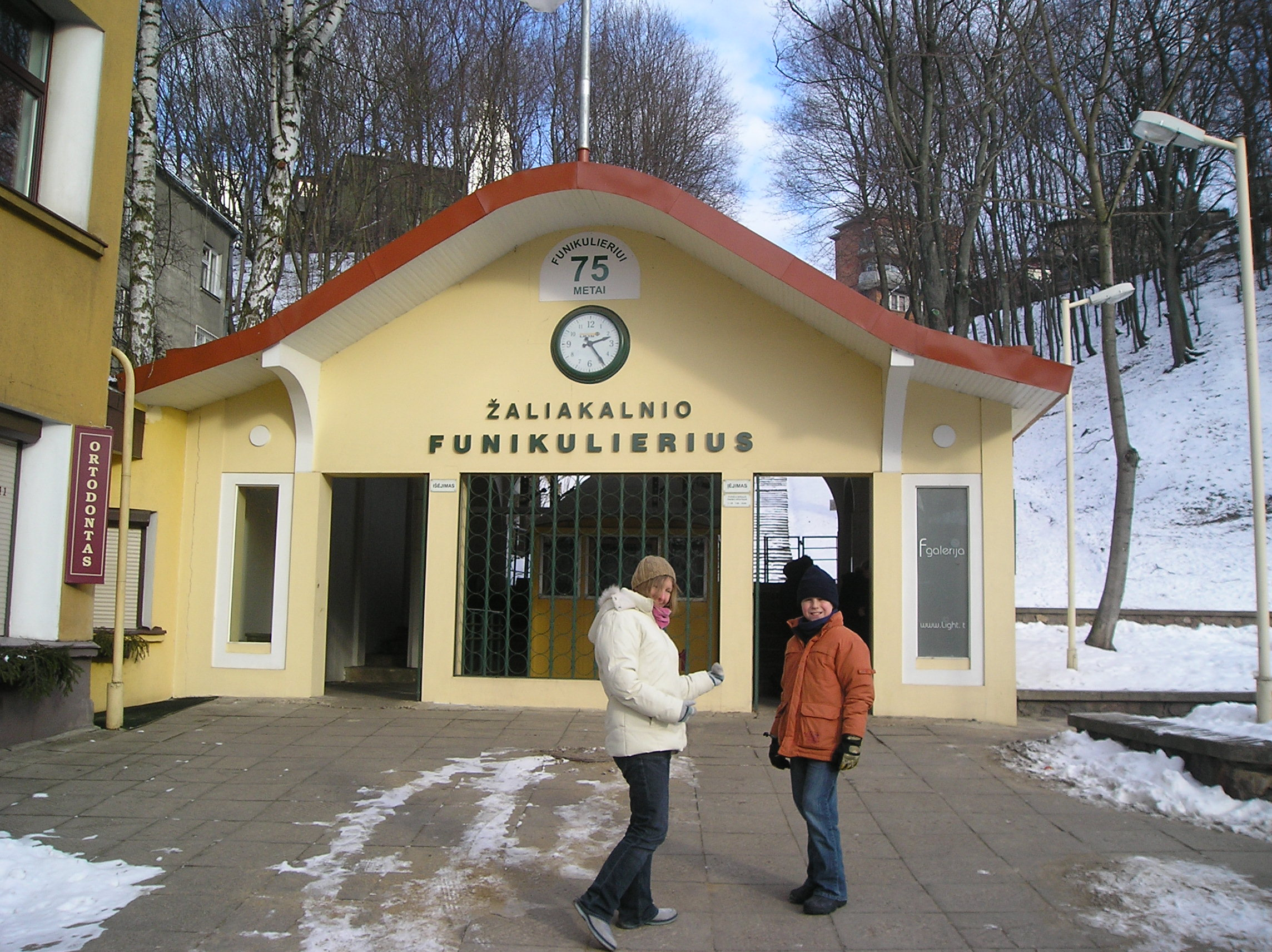
Žaliakalnis Funicular Railway

Location	Name of system	Date opened	Date closed	Notes
Kaunas	Žaliakalnis Funicular	1931		
Kaunas	Aleksotas Funicular	1935		
Vilnius	Gediminas Hill Lift	2003		

=== Luxembourg ===
Location	Name of system	Date opened	Date closed	Notes
Luxembourg City	Pfaffenthal-Kirchberg funicular	2017		

=== Malta ===
Location	Name of system	Date opened	Date closed	Notes
St. Julian's	The Valletta Funicular			

=== Norway ===
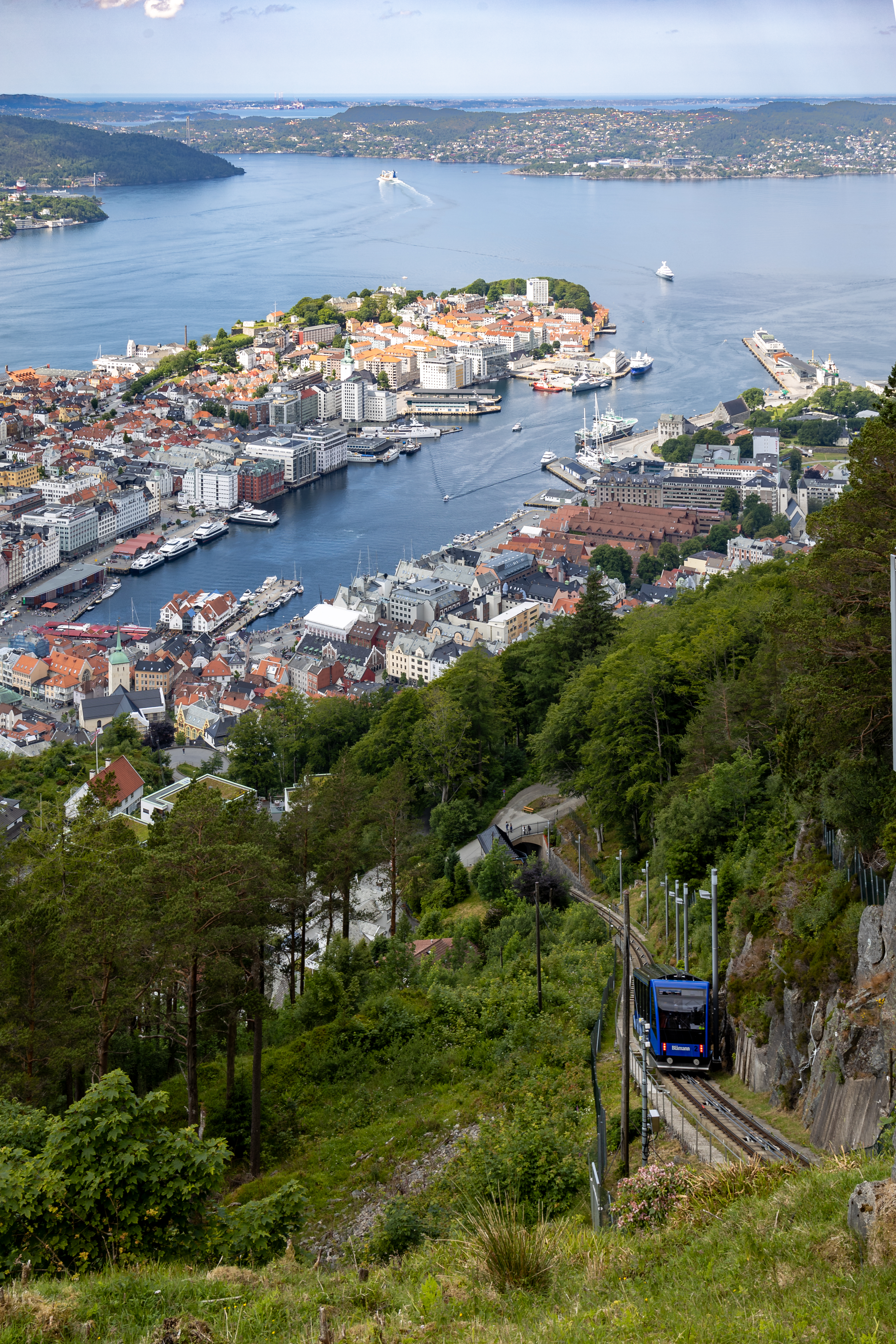
Fløibanen in Bergen.

Location	Name of system	Date opened	Date closed	Notes
Bergen	Fløibanen	1918		
Rjukan	Gaustatoppen			
Tyssedal	Mågelibanen	1912		

=== Poland ===
Location	Name of system	Date opened	Date closed	Notes
Krynica	Góra Parkowa funicular	1937		
Zakopane	Gubałówka Hill funicular	1938		
Międzybrodzie Żywieckie	Góra Żar funicular	2004		
Gdynia	Kamienna Góra funicular	2015		

=== Portugal ===
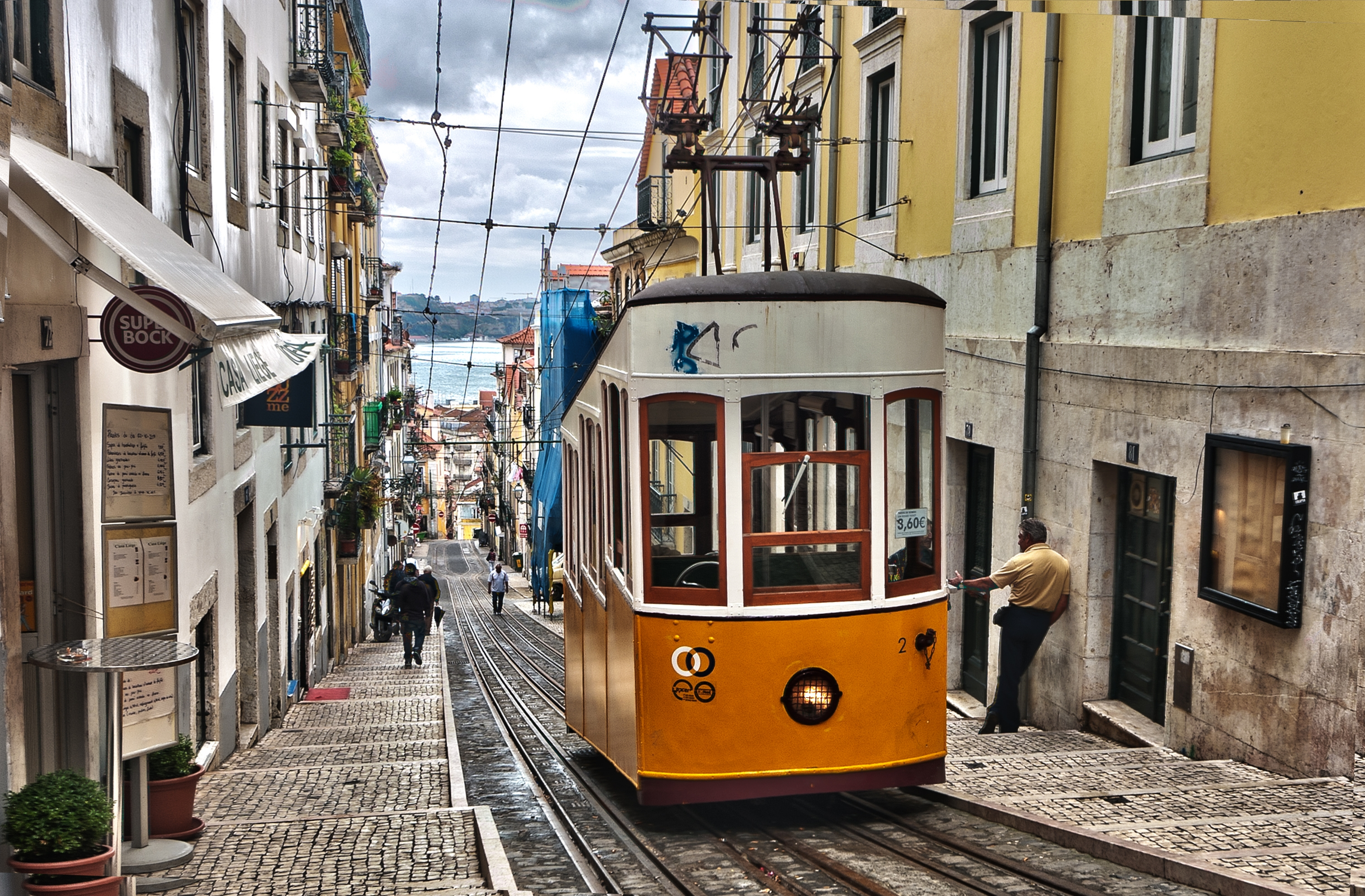
A view of the Bica Funicular as it travels between Rua da Bica de Duarte Belo and Rua de São Paulo

Location	Name of system	Date opened	Date closed	Notes
Braga	Bom Jesus do Monte Funicular (Portuguese: Elevador do Bom Jesus do Monte)	1880		
Lisbon	Bica Funicular (Portuguese: Elevador/Ascensor da Bica)	1892		Suspended in 2025, it had been in operation almost continuously for 134 years.
Lisbon	Glória Funicular (Portuguese: Elevador/Ascensor da Glória)	1885		Operations suspended following a derailment in September 2025, it had been in operation almost continuously for 141 years.
Lisbon	Lavra Funicular (Portuguese: Elevador/Ascensor do Lavra)	1884		Suspended in 2025, it had been in operation almost continuously for 142 years.
Porto	Guindais Funicular (Portuguese: Ascensor dos Guindais,)	1891 1893, 2004		
Nazaré	Nazaré Funicular (Portuguese: Ascensor da Nazaré)	1889		
Viana do Castelo	Santa Luzia Funicular (Portuguese: Elevador de Santa Luzia)	1923		
Viseu	Viseu Funicular (Portuguese: Funicular de Viseu)	2009	2019	

=== Russia ===
(Russia is a transcontinental country spanning Europe and Asia. All the funicular railways below are on the European side so are listed here.)

Location	Name of system	Date opened	Date closed	Notes
Nizhny Novgorod	Kremlin funicular	1896 re-opened 2024	1926	Totally rebuilt and re-opened 15 September 2024
Nizhny Novgorod	Pokhvalinsky funicular	1896	1927	
Sochi	Ordzhonikidze Sanatorium funicular (private)	1952	2010	
Sochi	"Sochinsky" Central Military Sanatorium funicular (private)	1934 re-opened 2015	2002	
Svetlogorsk	Svetlogorsk Funicular	1908	1960s	Replaced by a cable car from 1983

=== Romania ===
Location	Name of system	Date opened	Date closed	Notes
Covasna County	Covasna inclined plane	1886	1999	

=== Slovakia ===
Location	Name of system	Date opened	Date closed	Notes
Starý Smokovec	Starý Smokovec–Hrebienok funicular	1908		

=== Spain ===
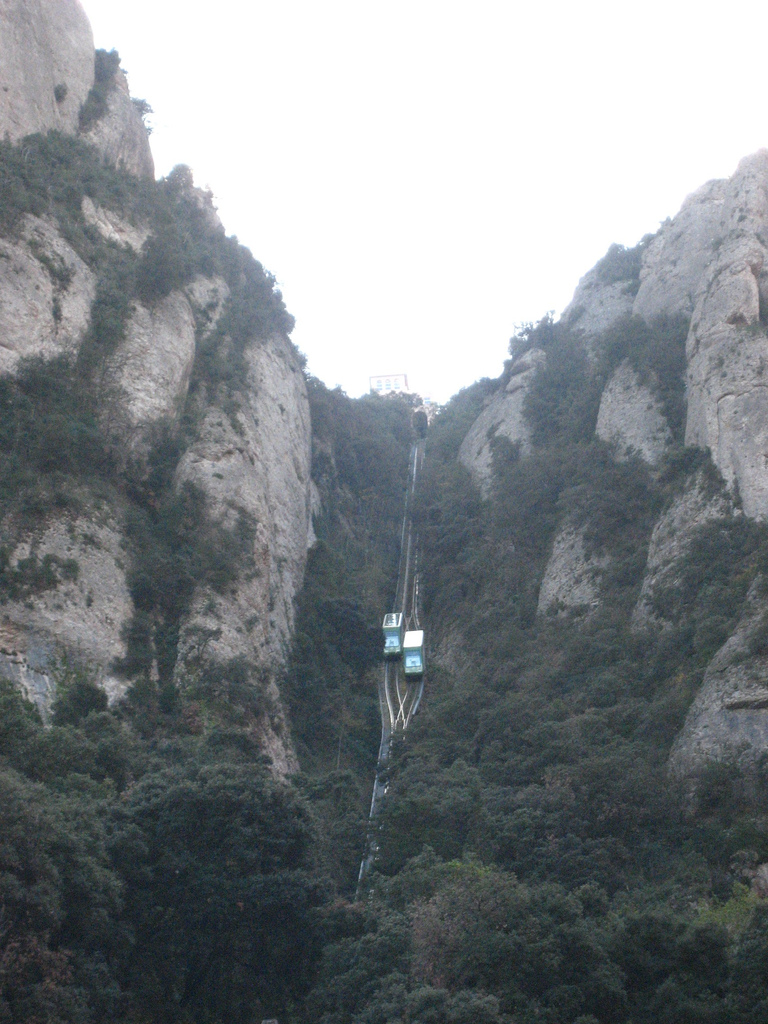
Funicular de Sant Joan

Location	Name of system	Date opened	Date closed	Notes
Asturias	Bulnes funicular	2001		
Barcelona	Montjuïc Funicular	1928		
Barcelona	Tibidabo Funicular	1901		
Barcelona	Vallvidrera Funicular	1906		
Bilbao	Artxanda Funicular	1915		
Bilbao	Larreineta funicular	1926		
Catalonia, Gelida	Gelida Funicular	1924		
Catalonia, Montserrat	Sant Joan Funicular	1918		
Catalonia, Montserrat	Santa Cova Funicular	1929		
Madrid, San Lorenzo de El Escorial	Valle de los Caídos funicular	1975	2009	
San Sebastián	Igueldo funicular	1912		
Santander	Río de la Pila funicular	2008		

=== Sweden ===
Location	Name of system	Date opened	Date closed	Notes
Stockholm	Skansens Bergbana	1897		
Åre, Jämtland County	Åre Bergbana	1910		
Skärholmen	Skärholmens bergbana			
Nacka Strand	Nacka Strand bergbana			
Liljeholmen	Nybohov lift	1964		

=== Switzerland ===
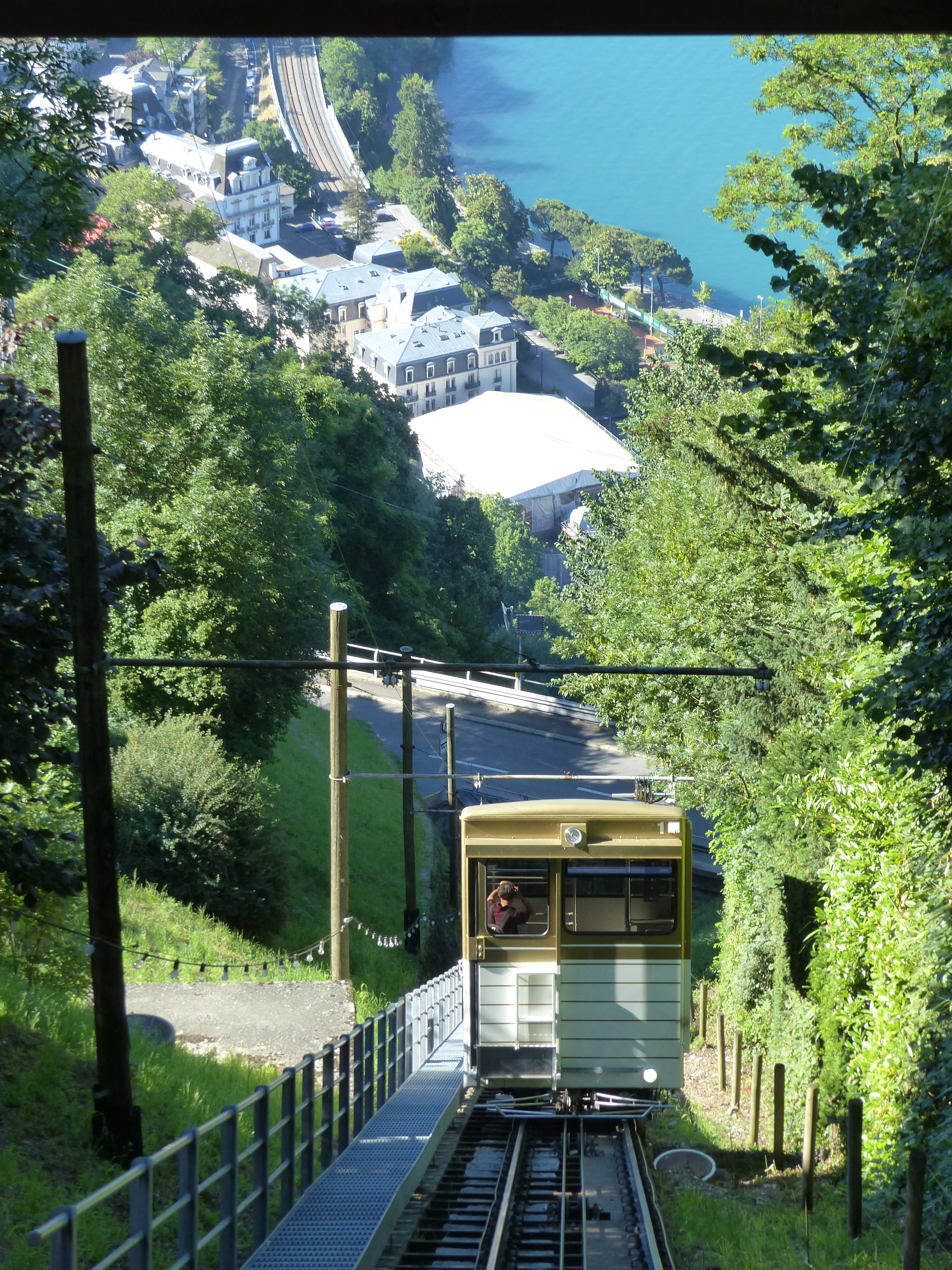
Territet–Glion funicular railway

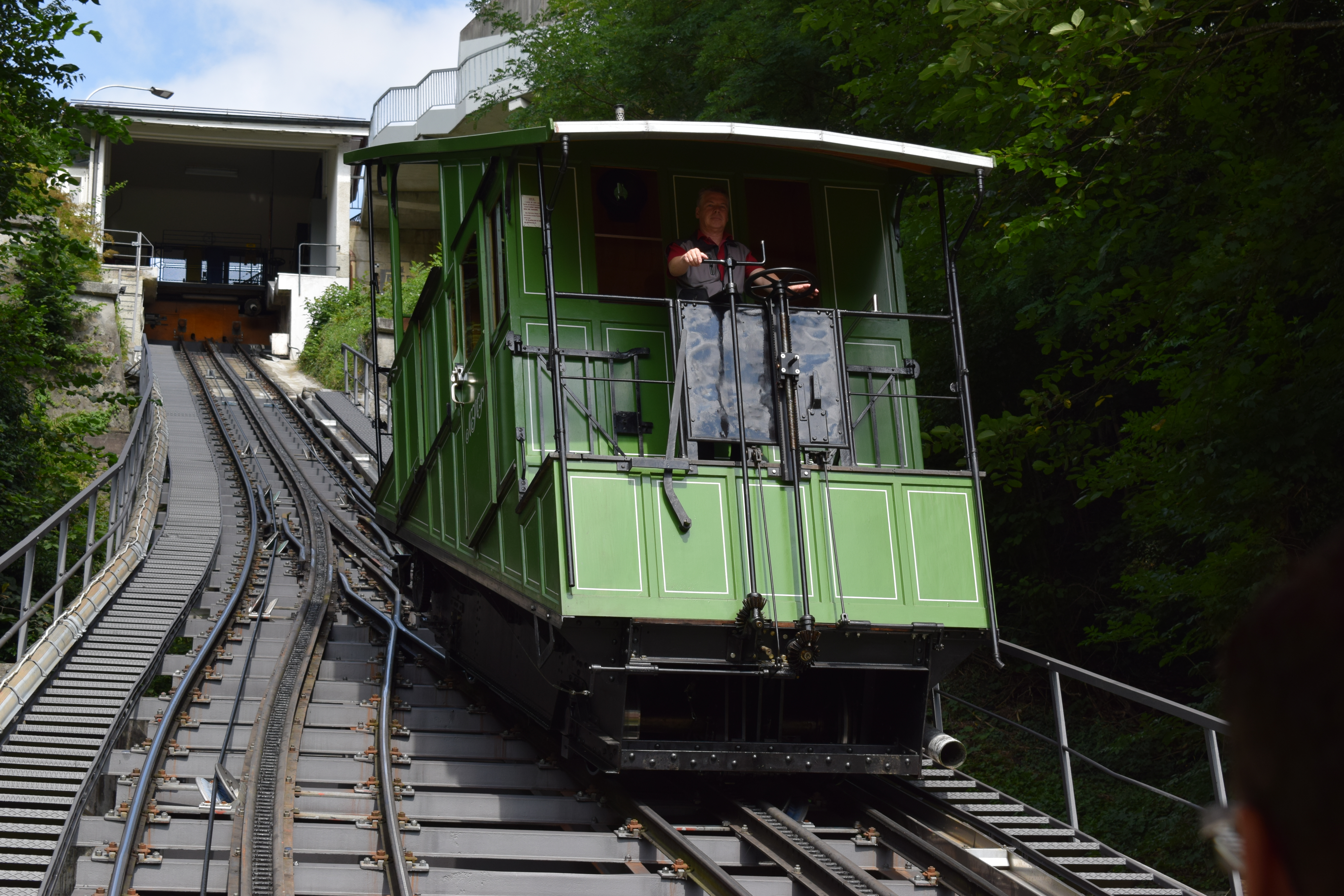
Fribourg Neuveville–Saint-Pierre (last water-powered)

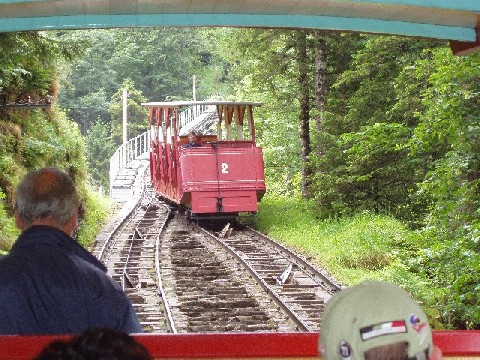
Reichenbachfall-Bahn

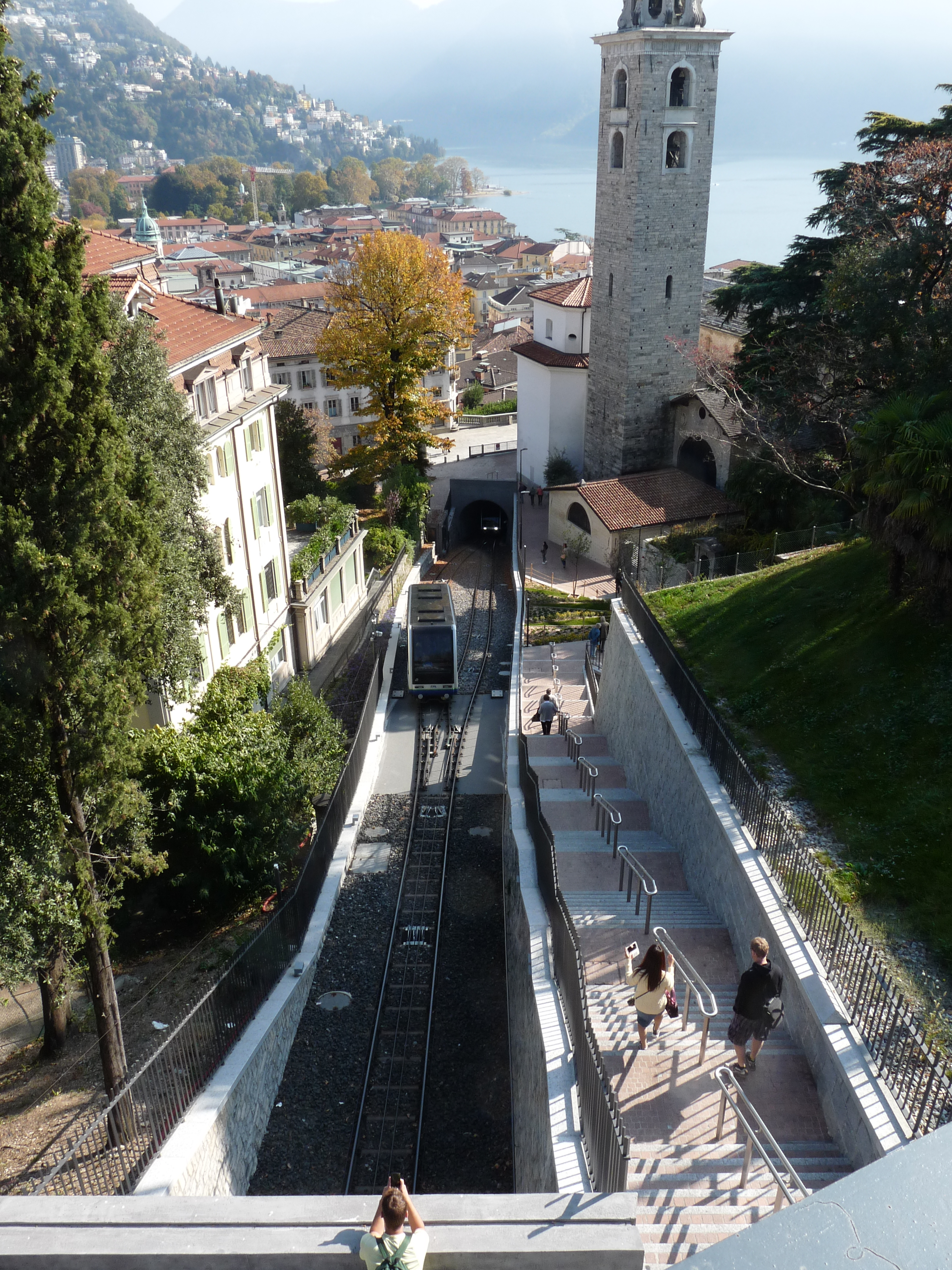
Lugano Città–Stazione (busiest)

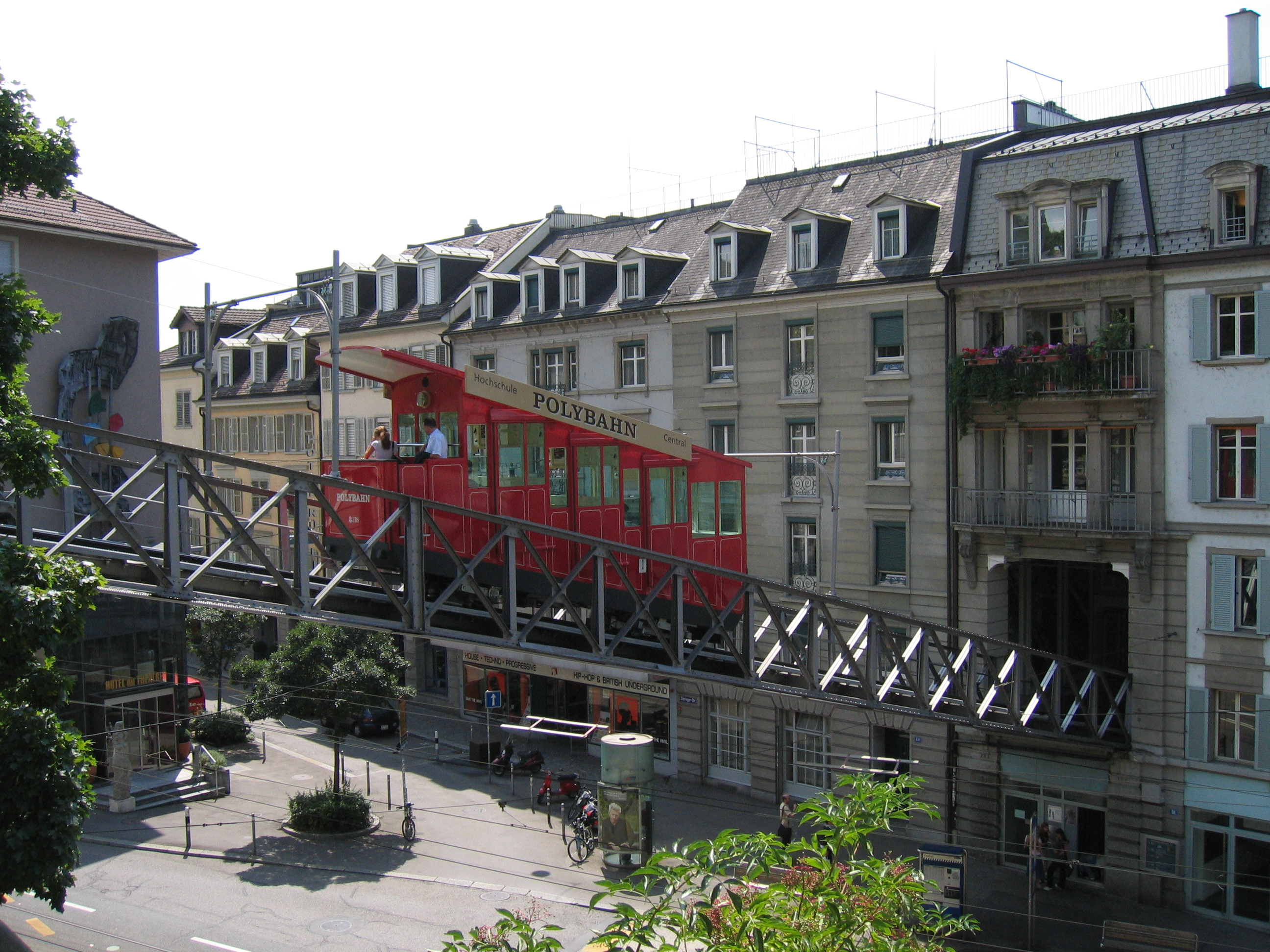
Polybahn (next to Zürich Hauptbahnhof)

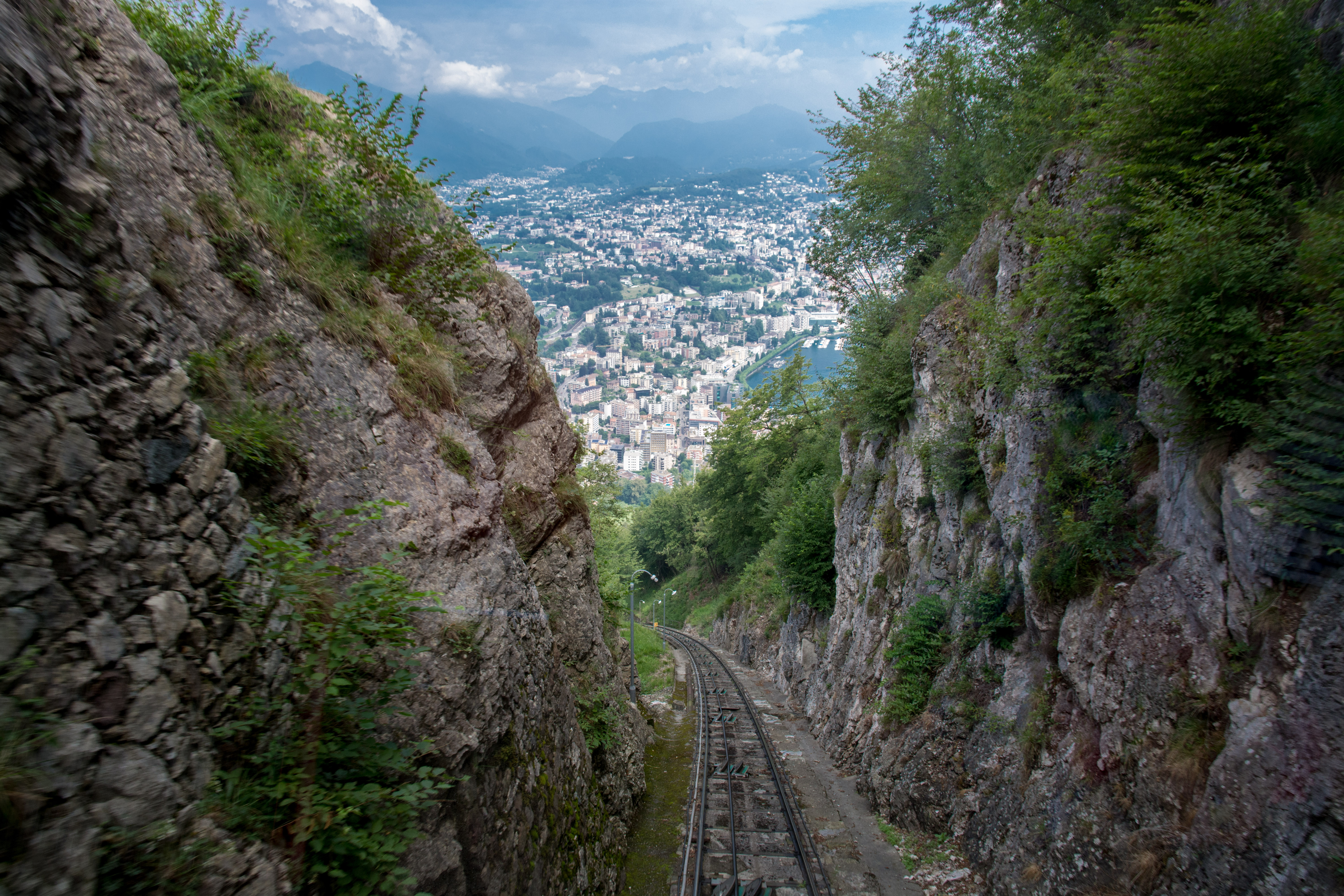
Monte San Salvatore (only two-section single-cable one)

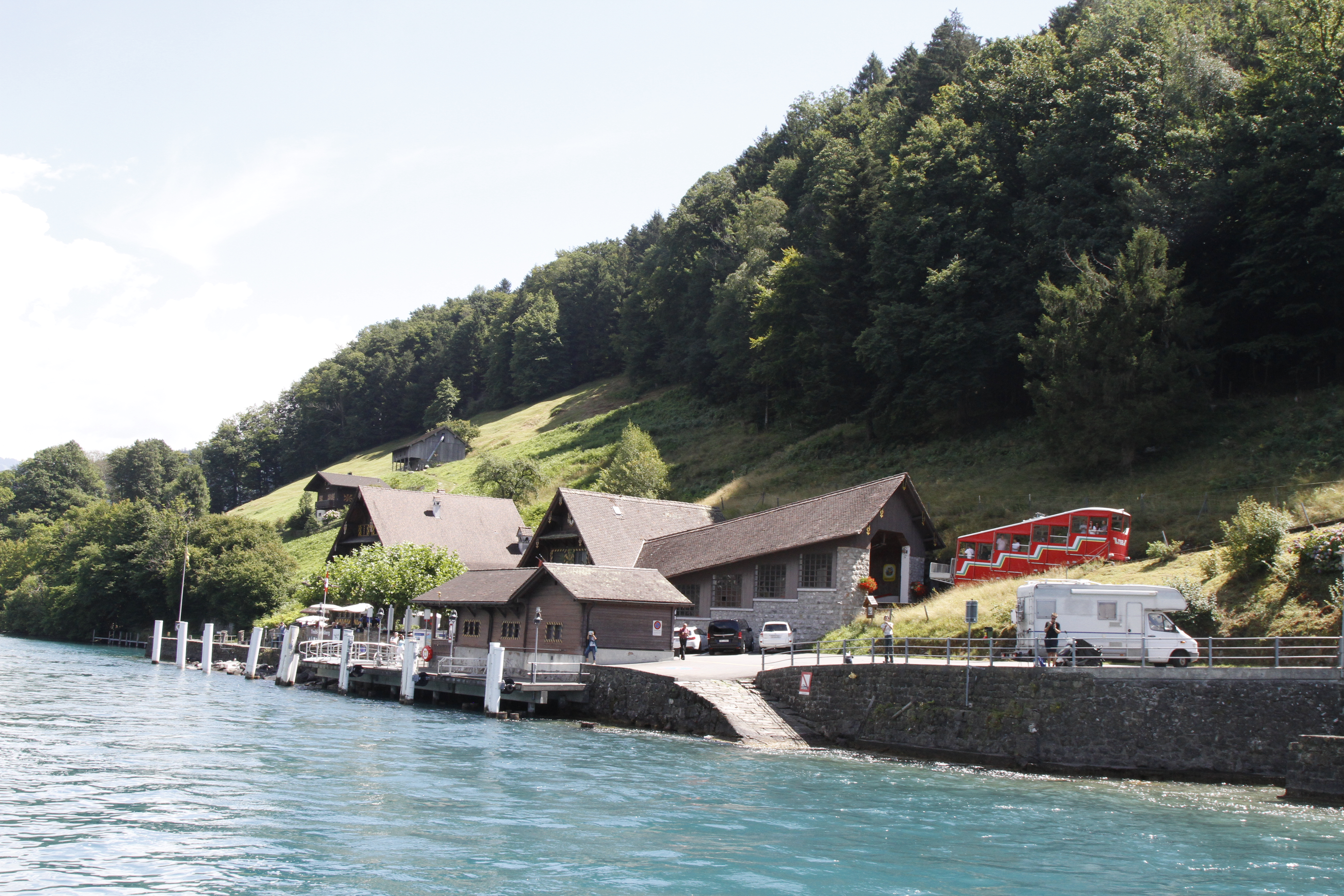
Treib–Seelisberg–Bahn

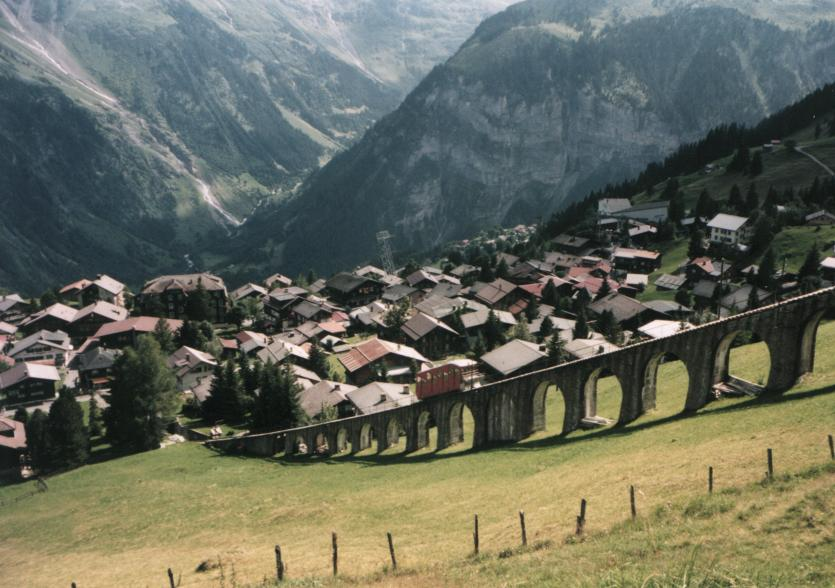
Mürren Allmendhubelbahn

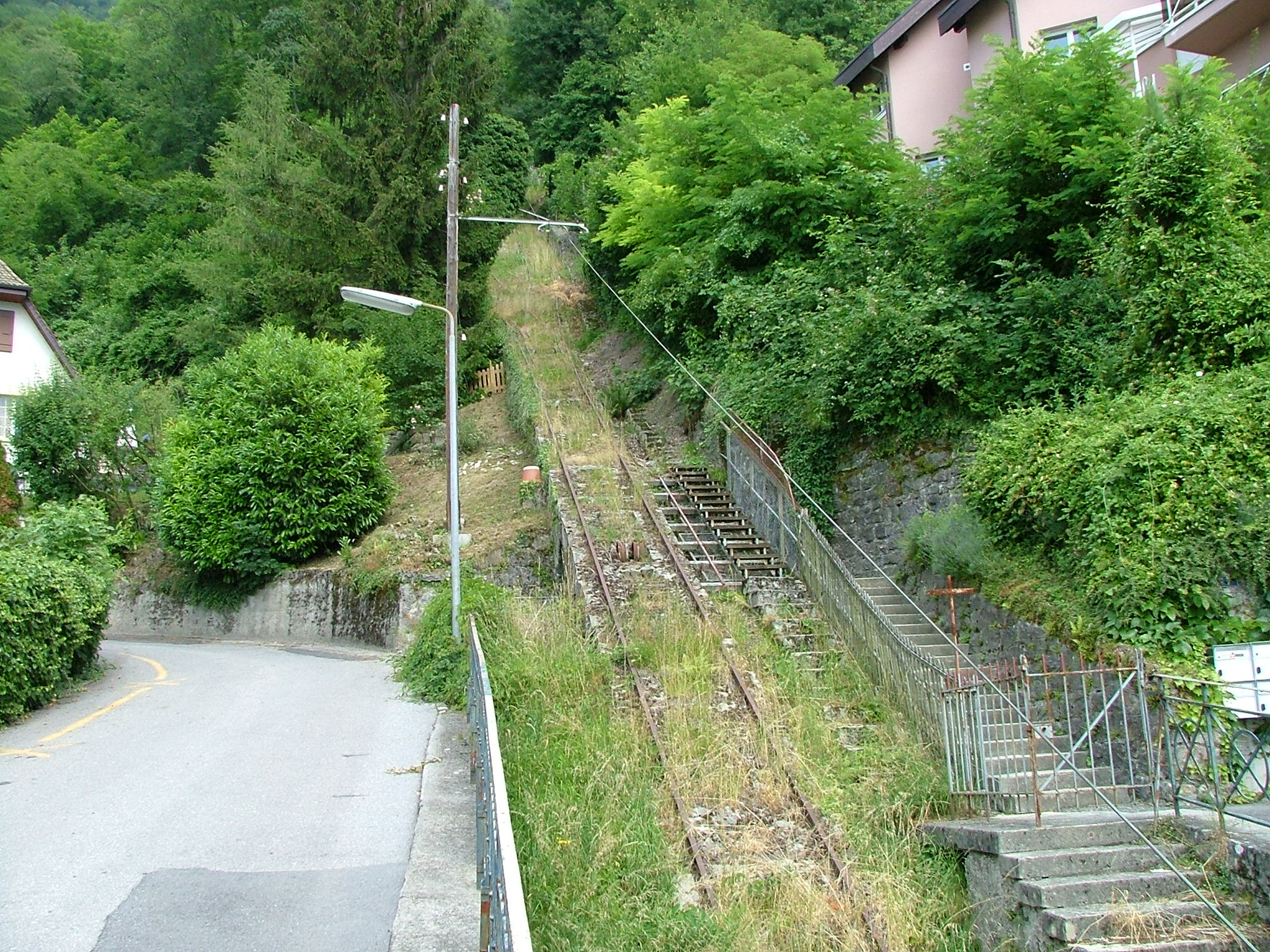
Montreux Territet–Mont Fleuri (an abandoned one)

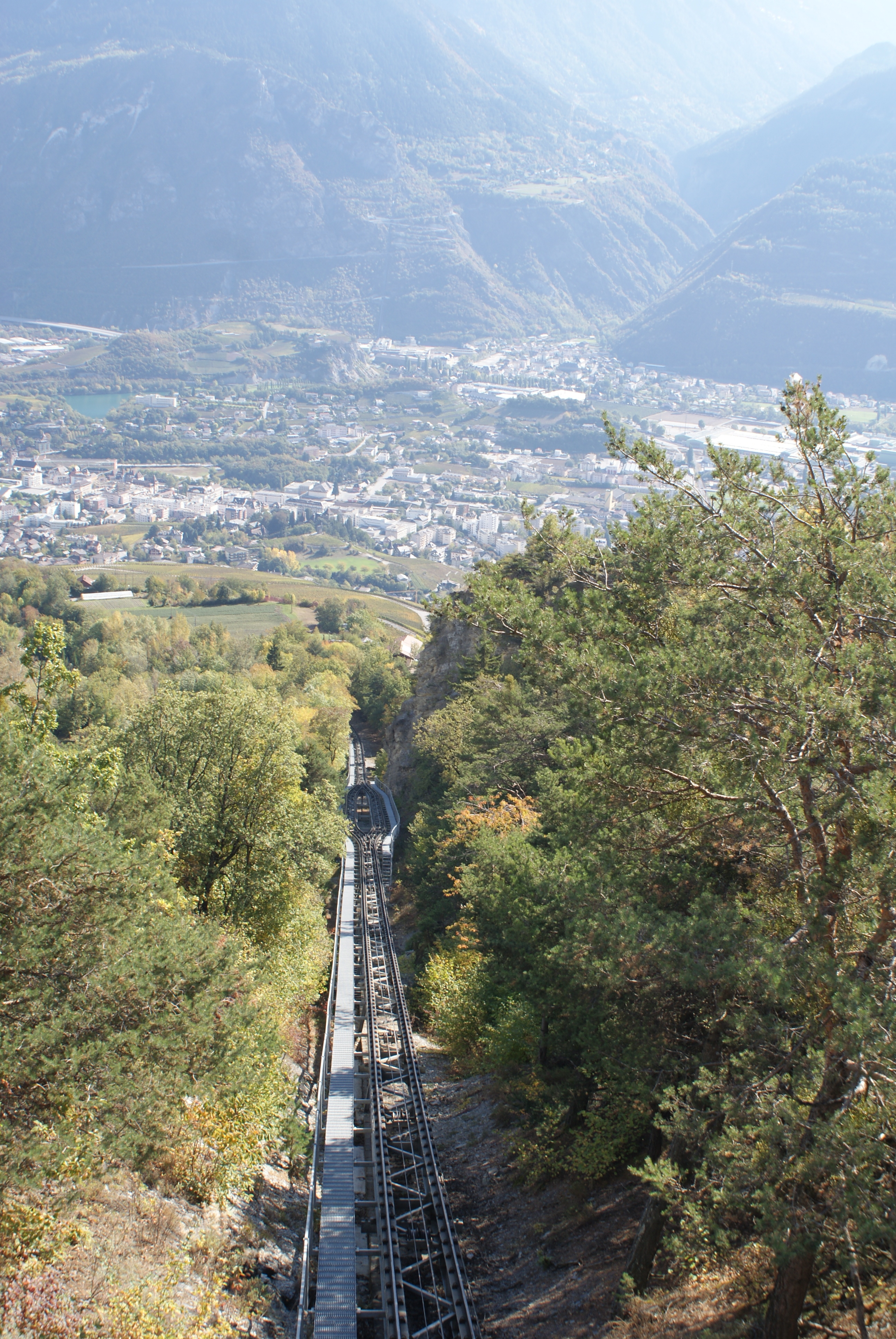
Sierre–Montana–Crans (longest)

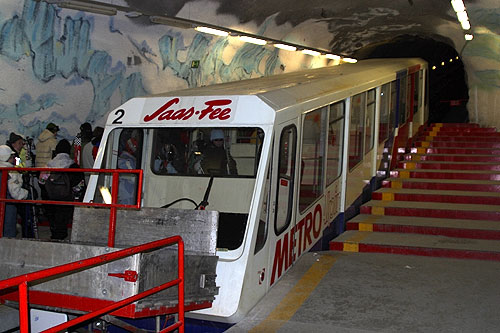
Saas-Fee Metro Alpin in Felskinn–Mittelallalin Tunnel (highest)

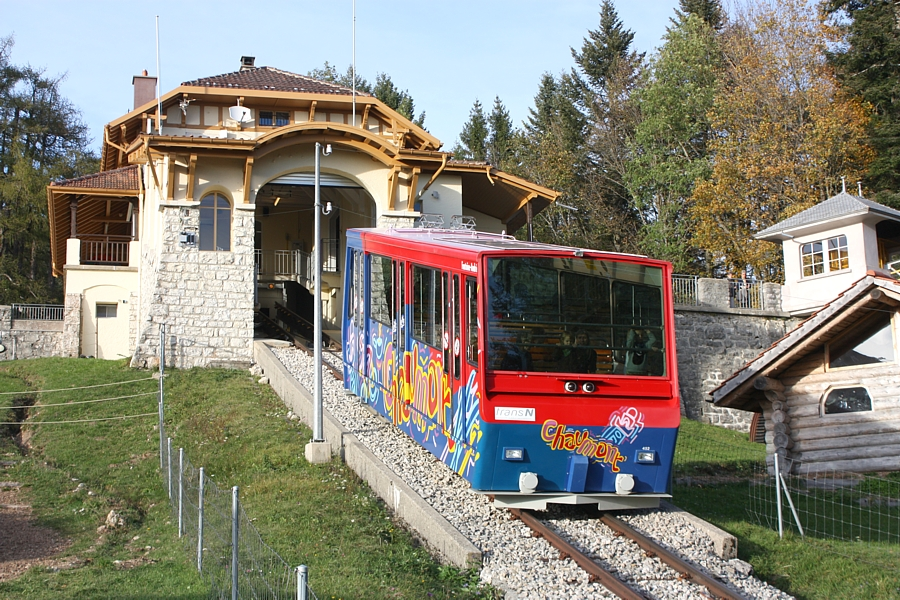
Neuchâtel-La Coudre Funiculaire de Chaumont

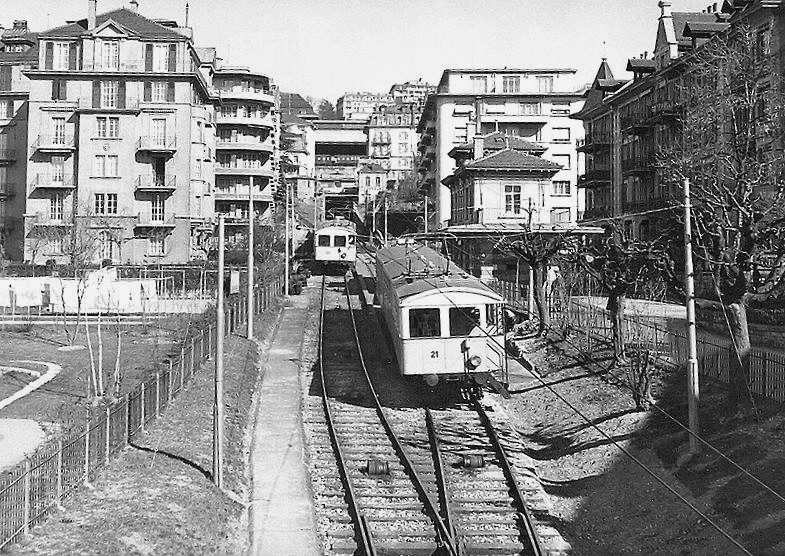
Chemin de fer Lausanne–Ouchy (first)

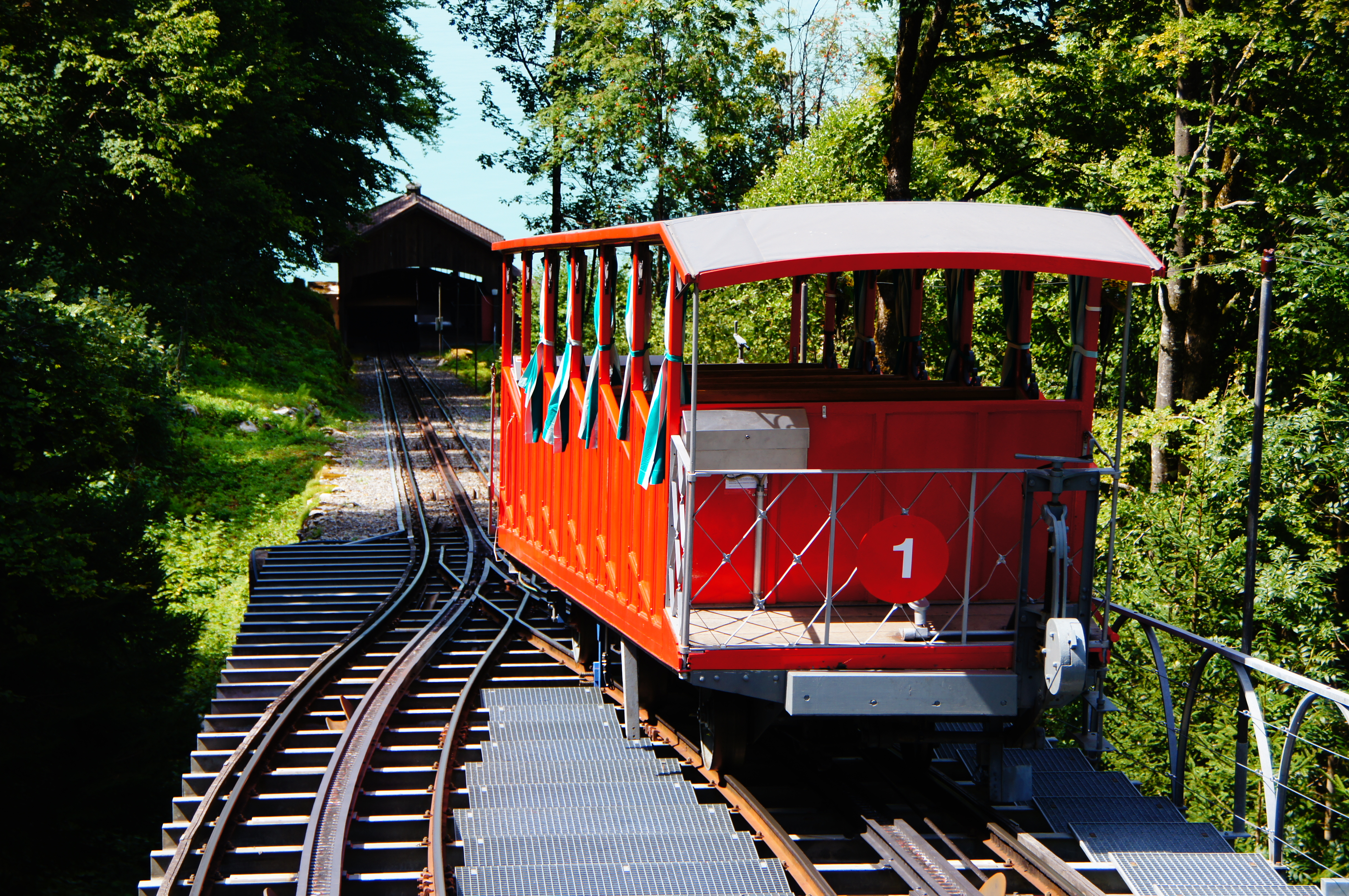
Giessbachbahn (oldest)

Region	Location	Name of system	Date opened	Date closed	Notes
Aargau	Wettingen	Schräglift Webermühle	2016		
Canton of Bern	Bern	Marzili Funicular	1885		
Canton of Bern	Bern	Bärenbähnli			
Canton of Bern	Beatenberg	Thunersee–Beatenberg Funicular	1889		
Canton of Bern	Biel/Bienne	Biel/Bienne–Leubringen/Evilard funicular	1898		
Canton of Bern	Biel/Bienne	Biel/Bienne–Magglingen/Macolin funicular	1887		
Canton of Bern	Brienz	Giessbachbahn	1879		
Canton of Bern	Handeck	Gelmer Funicular	1926		
Canton of Bern	Innertkirchen	Standseilbahn Urweid–Chapf	1940		
Canton of Bern	Interlaken	Harderbahn	1908		
Canton of Bern	Interlaken	Heimwehfluhbahn	1906		
Canton of Bern	Kandersteg	Nordic Arena lift			
Canton of Bern	Lauterbrunnen	Tunnel lift of Trümmelbach Falls	1913		
Canton of Bern	Lauterbrunnen	Seilbahn Lauterbrunnen–Grütschalp	1891	2006	Later an aerial cable car
Canton of Bern	Ligerz	Vinifuni Ligerz–Prêles	1912		
Canton of Bern	Mürren	Allmendhubelbahn	1912		
Canton of Bern	Meiringen	Reichenbachfall Funicular	1899		
Canton of Bern	Reichenbach	Niesenbahn	1910		
Canton of Bern	Ringgenberg	Schräglift Ringgenberg	2009		
Canton of Bern	Saint-Imier	Funiculaire Saint-Imier – Mont-Soleil	1903		
Canton of Bern	Wabern bei Bern	Gurten Funicular	1899		
Canton of Fribourg	Fribourg	Funiculaire Neuveville – Saint-Pierre à Fribourg	1899		
Canton of Fribourg	Moléson	Funiculaire Moléson-sur-Gruyères – Plan-Francey Glarus	1998		
Canton of Glarus	Linthal	Braunwaldbahn	1907		
Canton of Glarus	Linthal	Standseilbahn Linth-Limmern	2013		
Grisons (Graubünden)	Arosa	Tschuggen Express	2018		
Grisons (Graubünden)	Davos	Parsenn Funicular	1931		
Grisons (Graubünden)	Davos	Schatzalp-Bahn	1899		
Grisons (Graubünden)	Flims	Caumasee-Lift	1937		
Grisons (Graubünden)	Poschiavo	Cavaglia–Palü funicular	1926 2002		
Grisons (Graubünden)	Samedan	Muottas-Muragl-Bahn	1907		
Grisons (Graubünden)	Sedrun	Standseilbahn Mira–Las Rueras	1997	2014	
Grisons (Graubünden)	St. Moritz	St. Moritz–Corviglia Funicular	1913 1928		2 sections
Canton of Lucerne	Kriens	Sonnenberg Funicular	1902	1955	
Canton of Lucerne	Luzern	Gütsch Funicular (Drahtseilbahn Gütsch)	1884		
Canton of Lucerne	Luzern	Standseilbahn Hotel Montana	1910		
Canton of Lucerne	Luzern	Dietschibergbahn	1912	1978	
Canton of Lucerne	Bürgenstock	Bürgenstock Funicular	1888		
Canton of Neuchâtel	Neuchâtel	Fun'ambule (Gare–Université)	2001		
Canton of Neuchâtel	Neuchâtel	Funiculaire Ecluse–Plan	1890		
Canton of Neuchâtel	Neuchâtel	Funiculaire de Chaumont (La Coudre–Chaumont)	1910		
Canton of Neuchâtel	Neuchâtel	Funiculaire Suchard in Serrières	1892	1955	
Nidwalden	Stans	Stanserhorn-Bahn	1893	1974	3 sections in 1897, 2 converted to an aerial cableway in 1973
Nidwalden	Stansstad	Fürigenbahn	1924	2005	
Obwalden	Engelberg	Gerschnialpbahn	1913		
Obwalden	Engelberg	Drahtseilbahn Engelberg–Hotel Terrasse	1905	2008	
Canton of Schwyz	Schwyz	Stoosbahn	2017		
Canton of Schwyz	Schwyz	Drahtseilbahn Schwyz–Stoos	1933	2017	
Canton of St. Gallen	Walzenhausen	Bergbahn Rheineck–Walzenhausen	1896	1958	Later a rack railway
Canton of St. Gallen	Bad Ragaz	Wartensteinbahn	1891	1964	
Canton of St. Gallen	St. Gallen	Mühleggbahn	1893		
Canton of St. Gallen	Unterwasser	Iltiosbahn	1934		
Ticino	Locarno	Locarno–Madonna del Sasso funicular	1906		
Ticino	Lugano	Lugano Città–Stazione funicular	1886		
Ticino	Lugano	Monte Brè funicular	1908 1912		
Ticino	Lugano	Monte San Salvatore funicular	1890		
Ticino	Lugano	Lugano degli Angioli funicular	1913	1986	
Ticino	Piotta	Ritom funicular	1921		
Canton of Uri	Amsteg	Standseilbahn Amsteg–Arniberg			
Canton of Uri	Amsteg	Standseilbahn Amsteg–Bristen	1920		
Canton of Uri	Treib	Treib–Seelisberg railway	1916		
Valais	Bettmeralp	Schräglift Alpmatten (Mieschgihalta)	2000		
Valais	Le Châtelard	Funiculaire du Châtelard (funiculaire de Barberine)	1921	2022	
Valais	Le Châtelard	Mini-Funiculaire d'Emosson	1991		
Valais	Nendaz	Funiculaire Ecluses-Tracouet (Mer de Glace)			
Valais	Saas-Fee	Metro Alpin Felskinn–Mittelallalin (highest in the world)	1984		
Valais	St-Luc	Funiculaire St-Luc – Tignousa	1994		
Valais	Sierre	Funiculaire Sierre–Montana–Crans (Sierre – Montana-Vermala)	1911		
Valais	Zermatt	Zermatt–Sunnegga Funicular	1980		
Valais	Zermatt	Leisee Shuttle	2008		
Vaud	Cossonay	Funiculaire de Cossonay (Cossonay-Gare – Cossonay-Ville)	1897		
Vaud	Les Avants	Les Avants–Sonloup funicular	1912		
Vaud	Lausanne	Métro Lausanne–Ouchy	1877	1958	Later a rack railway and a rubber tyred metro
Vaud	Lausanne	Funiculaire Lausanne Flon–Gare	1879	1959	Later a rack railway
Vaud	Lausanne	Funiculaire Lausanne-Signal	1899	1948	
Vaud	Montreux	Territet–Glion funicular railway	1883		
Vaud	Montreux	Funiculaire Territet–Mont Fleuri	1910	1992	
Vaud	Vevey	Vevey–Chardonne–Mont Pèlerin funicular railway	1900		
Canton of Zug	Zug	Zugerberg Funicular	1907		
Canton of Zurich	Kloten (Zurich Airport)	Skymetro	2003		
Canton of Zurich	Kloten (Zurich Airport)	Parkbahn (Standseilbahn The Circle-Butzenbüel)	2020		
Canton of Zurich	Zurich	Polybahn (Zürichbergbahn)	1889		
Canton of Zurich	Zurich	Funicular Rigiblick (Seilbahn Rigiviertel)	1901		
Canton of Zurich	Zurich	Dolderbahn	1895	1971	Later a rack railway

=== Turkey ===
(Turkey straddles the border between Europe and Asia, which passes along the Bosphorus Strait. All the funicular railways below are on the European side of the Bosphorus Strait so are listed here.)

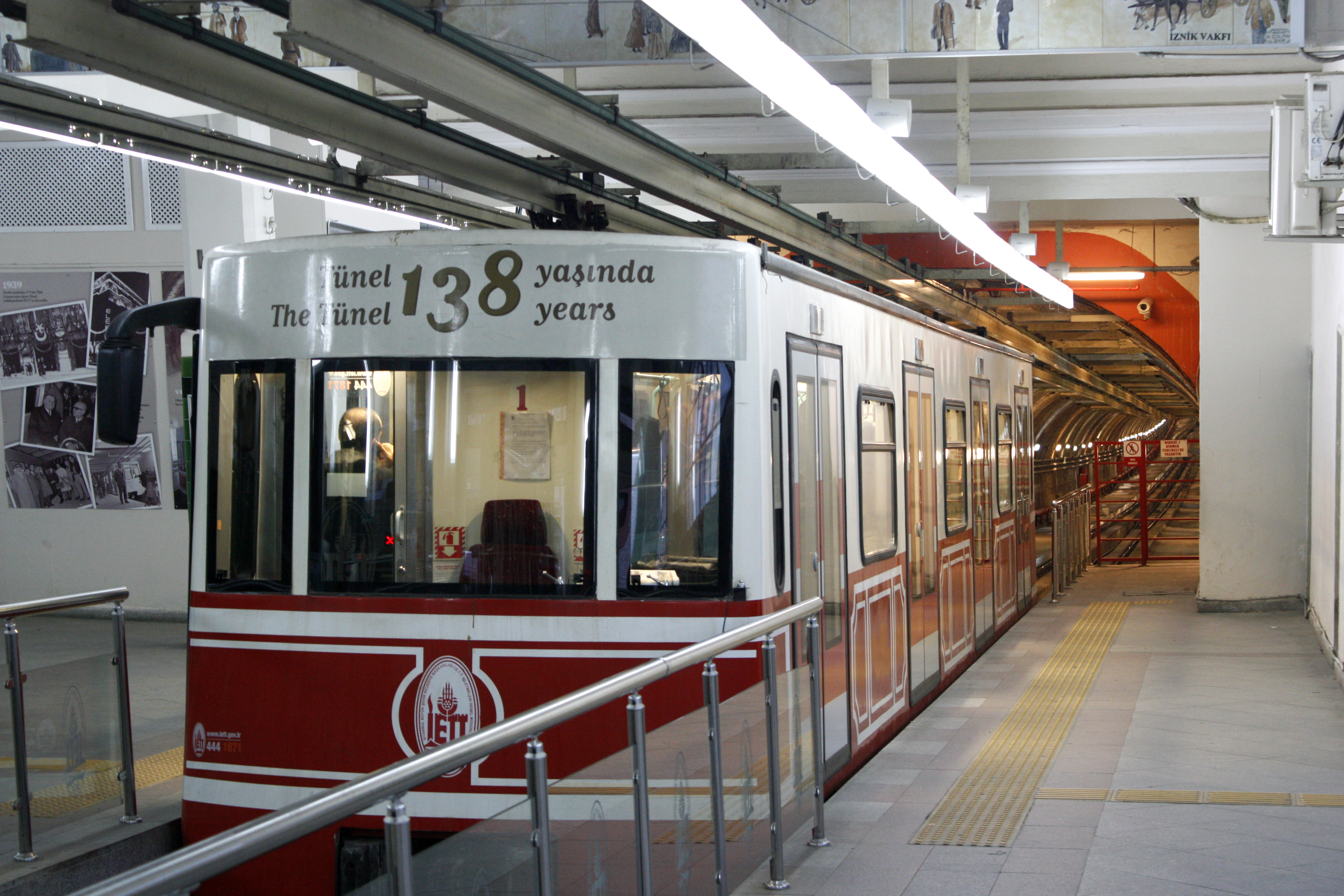
Istanbul Tünel

Location	Name of system	Date opened	Date closed	Notes
Istanbul	Tünel	1875		
Istanbul	Kabataş-Taksim Funicular	2006		
Istanbul	Vadistanbul–Seyrantepe Funicular	2017		
Istanbul	Boğaziçi Üniversitesi/Hisarüstü–Aşiyan Funicular	2022		

=== Ukraine ===
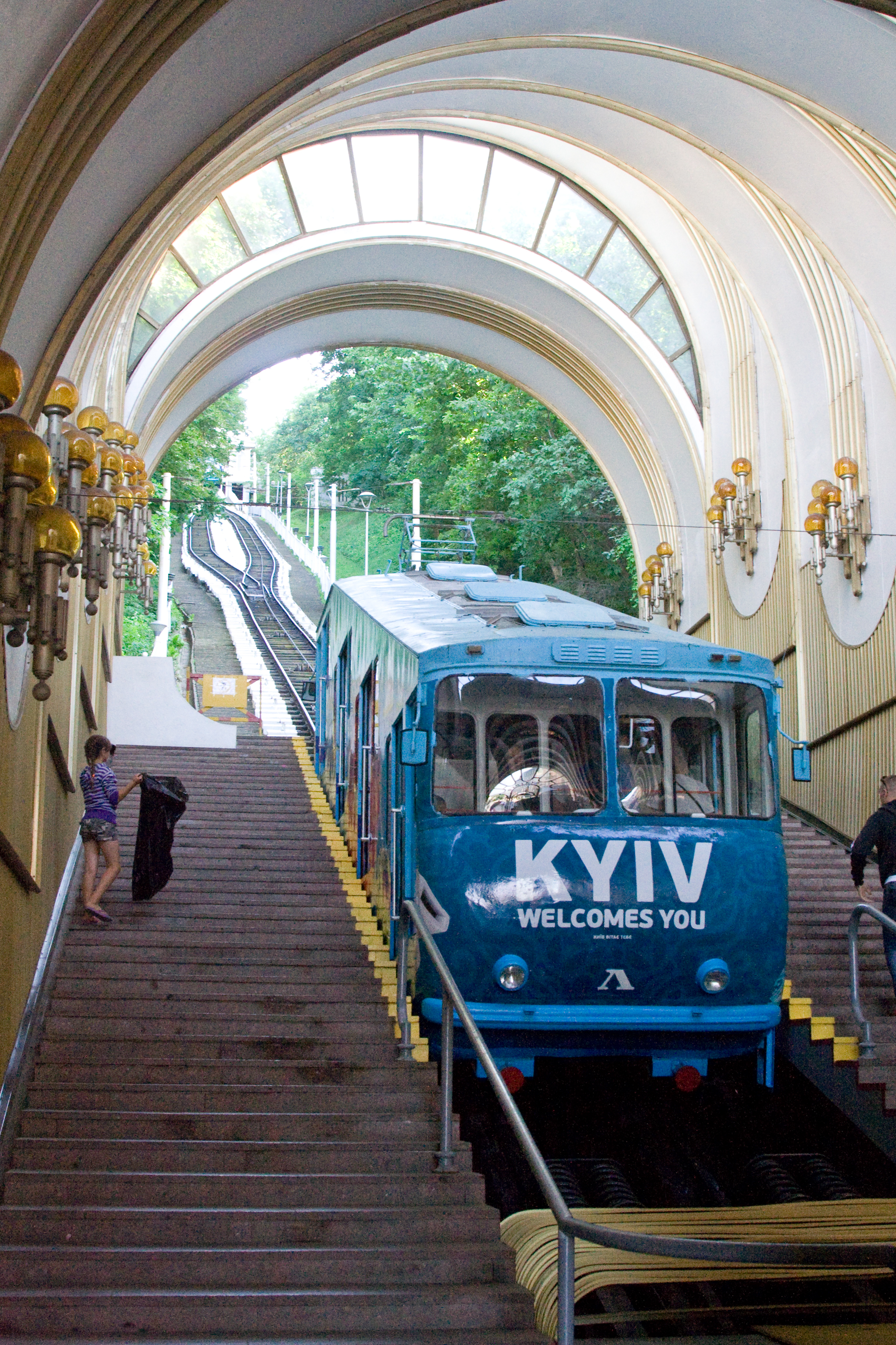
Kyiv Funicular

Location	Name of system	Date opened	Date closed	Notes
Kyiv	Kyiv Funicular	1905		
Odesa	Odesa Funicular	1902 re-opened 2005	1969	

=== United Kingdom and Crown dependencies ===
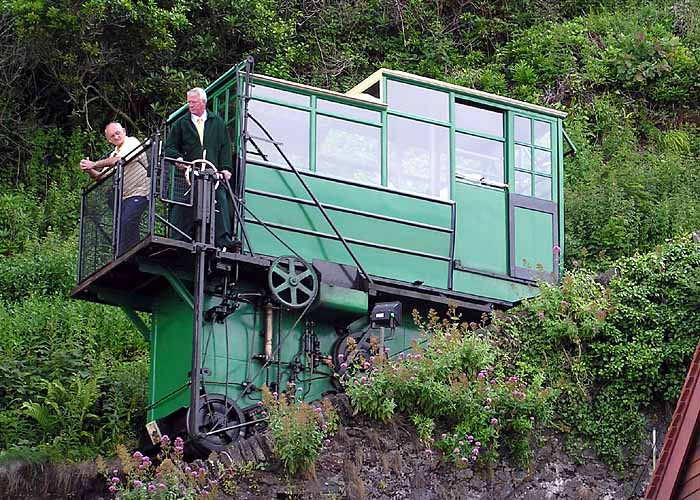
Lynton and Lynmouth Cliff Railway

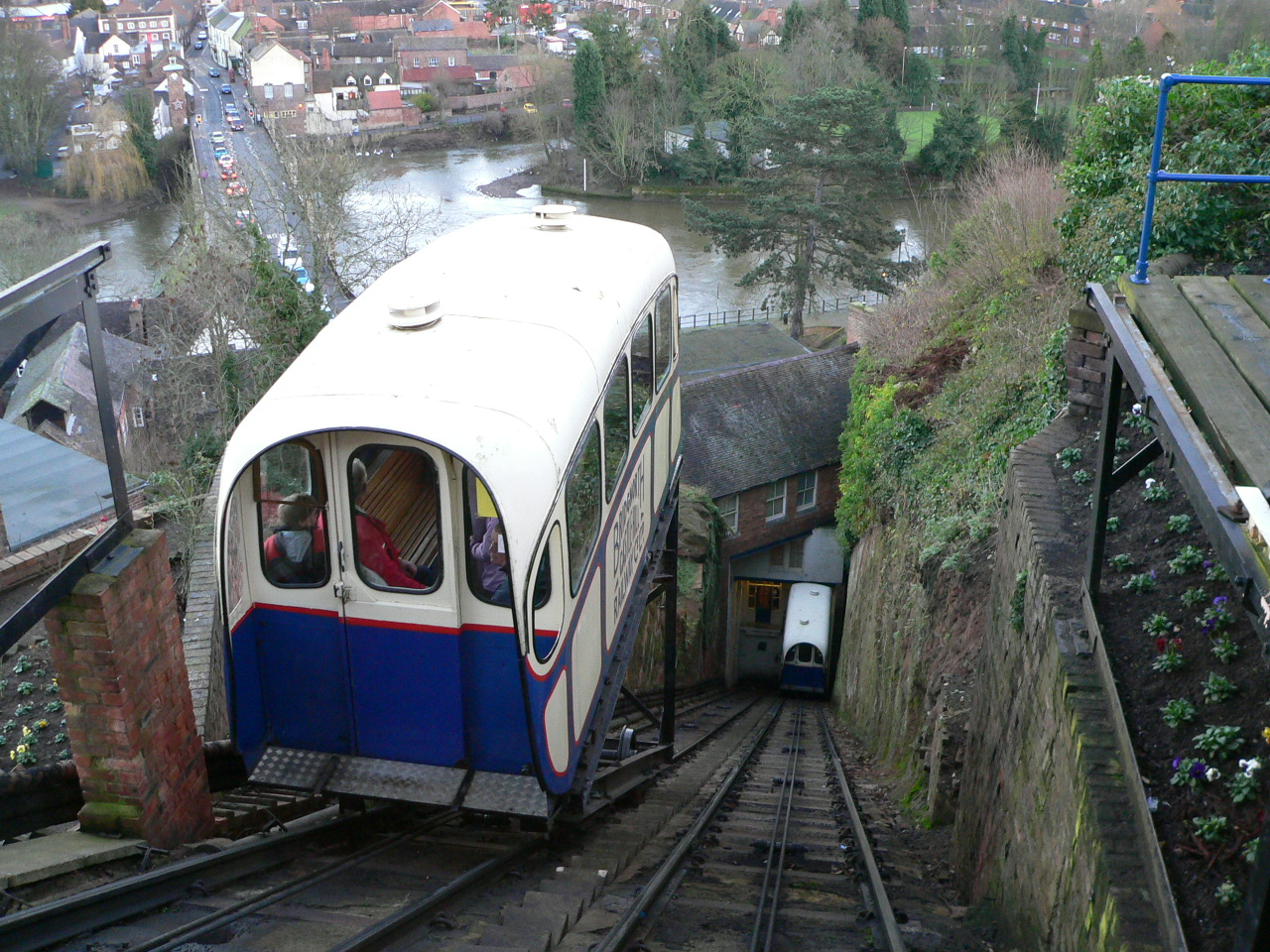
Bridgnorth Cliff Railway

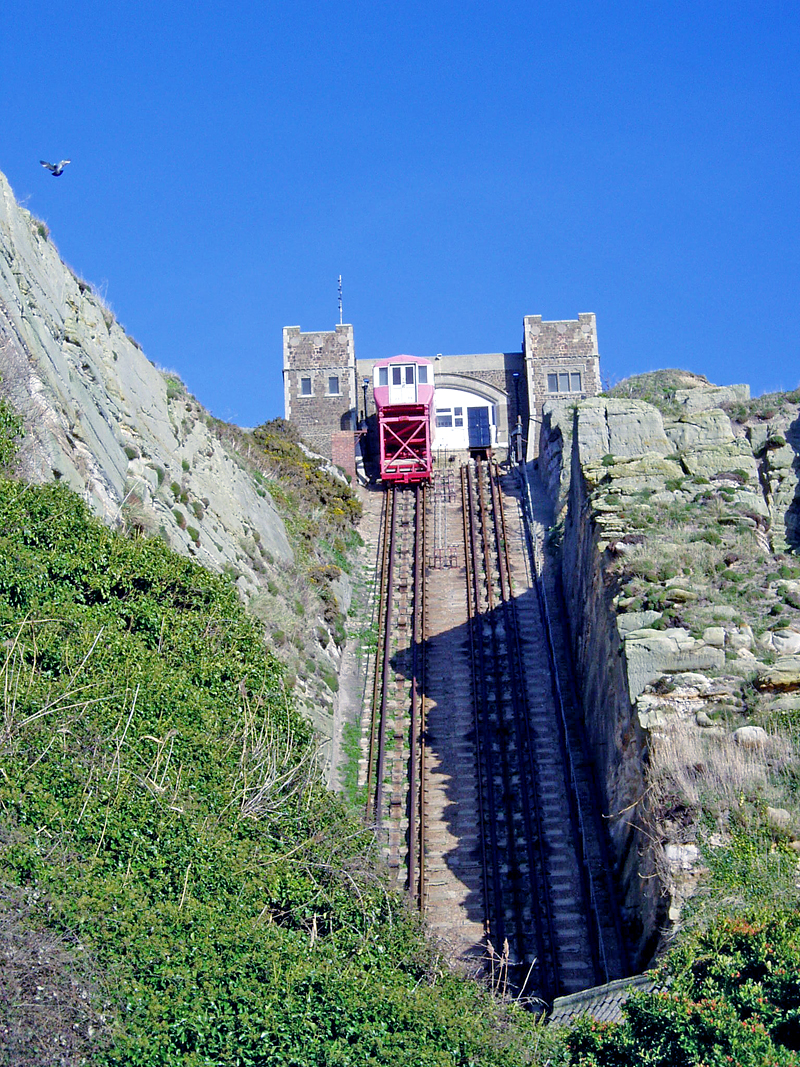
Hastings East Hill Cliff Railway

==== England ====
Location	Name of system	Date opened	Date closed	Notes
Bournemouth	East Cliff Lift	1908	2016	
Bournemouth	Fisherman's Walk Cliff Lift	1935		
Bournemouth	Westcliff Lift	1908		
Bridgnorth	Bridgnorth Cliff Railway	1892		
Brighton	Devil's Dyke Steep Grade Railway	1897	1909	Linked the village of Poynings to the top of the Devil's Dyke
Bristol	Clifton Rocks Railway	1893	1934	All in tunnel
Broadstairs	Broadstairs Cliff Railway	1901	1991	Inclined elevator, all in tunnel
Folkestone	Leas Lift	1885	2017	Second pair 1890–1966 – water balanced
Hastings	East Hill Lift	1903		
Hastings	West Hill Lift	1891		
Lizard	The Lizard Lifeboat Station (RNLI)	1995		
Lynton and Lynmouth	Lynton and Lynmouth Cliff Railway	1890		Water balanced
London	London Millennium Funicular	2003	2021	Inclined elevator
Manchester	URBIS Museum	2002		
Margate	Margate Cliff Railway (Cliftonville Lido)	1913	1970s	Inclined elevator, parallel to cliff
Padstow	Padstow Cliff Railway (RNLI)	2001		
St Michael's Mount	St Michael's Mount Tramway	1900		Private underground goods funicular
Saltburn-by-the-Sea	Saltburn Cliff Tramway	1884		Water balanced
Scarborough	Central Tramway Company, Scarborough	1881		See also article Scarborough funiculars
Scarborough	North Cliff Lift	1930	1996	See also article Scarborough funiculars
Scarborough	Queens Parade Cliff Lift	1878	1887	See also article Scarborough funiculars
Scarborough	St Nicholas Cliff Lift	1929	2006	See also article Scarborough funiculars
Scarborough	Spa Cliff Lift	1873		See also article Scarborough funiculars
Sennen Cove	Private funicular			
Shipley	Shipley Glen Tramway	1895		
Southend-on-Sea	Southend Cliff Lift	1912		Inclined elevator
Torquay	Babbacombe Cliff Railway	1926		
Wakefield	National Coal Mining Museum	1988 or 1990		
Windsor	Legoland Hill Train (formerly Windsor Safari Park Funicular)	1996		Originally opened in the Windsor Safari Park in March 1991 it closed with the demise of the park in Oct 1992.
York	National Railway Museum			Museum Inclinator (removed 2013)

==== Scotland ====
Location	Name of system	Date opened	Date closed	Notes
Aviemore	Cairngorm Mountain Railway	2001 re-opened 2023	2018	

==== Wales ====
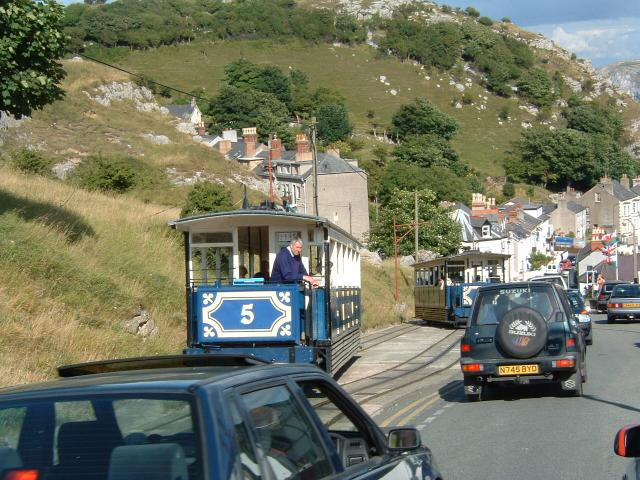
Great Orme Tramway

Location	Name of system	Date opened	Date closed	Notes
Aberporth	Clausen Rolling Platform			
Aberystwyth	Cliff Railway / Rheilffordd y Graig	1896		
Blaenau Ffestiniog	Llechwedd Slate Caverns			
Ebbw Vale	Ebbw Vale Garden Festival Funicular	1992	1992	
Ebbw Vale	Ebbw Vale Cableway	2015		75 foot rise
Llandudno	Great Orme Tramway / Tramffordd y Gogarth	1902		
Machynlleth	Centre for Alternative Technology Railway Funicular	1992		CAT – water balanced
Swansea	Constitution Hill Incline Tramway	1898	1901	

==== Isle of Man ====
Location	Name of system	Date opened	Date closed	Notes
Douglas	Douglas Head Incline Railway	1900	1954	
Douglas	First Falcon Cliff Lift	1887	1896	
Laxey	Laxey Browside Tramway	1890	1906 or 1914)	
Port Soderick	Port Soderick Beach Funicular	1897	1939	

== Oceania ==
=== Australia ===
Location	Name of system	Date opened	Date closed	Notes
Katoomba	Katoomba Scenic Railway	1945		This is an inclined lift, not a funicular, though many sources describe it as a funicular.

=== New Zealand ===
Location	Name of system	Date opened	Date closed	Notes
Wellington	Wellington Cable Car	1902		
Selwyn District	Tyndall Tramway, Broken River Ski Area, Craigieburn Valley.	1985		Goods lift from 1985, opened 2009 upgraded to carry passengers.

== See also ==
- Kaprun disaster
- List of cable car systems
- List of inclined elevators
- List of aerial tramways
- List of gondola lifts
