= Bica =

Bica may refer to:

- Bica (coffee), a type of coffee beverage originally from Portugal
- Bica, Cluj, one of 6 villages comprising the Mănăstireni commune in Cluj County, Romania
- Bica-Q, a trade name of the antiandrogen bicalutamide
- Fazenda da Bica, a region of Rio de Janeiro, Brazil
- Quinta da Bica, a quinta (estate) near Seia, Beira region, Portugal
- Bicalutamide, a drug used to treat prostate cancer and in feminizing hormone therapy

== People ==
- Bica (footballer) (Marcus Di Giuseppe, born 1972), Brazilian footballer
- Camillo Mac Bica (born 1947), American philosopher, poet, activist, and author
- Carlos Bica (active from 1998), Portuguese jazz bassist
- José Bica (born 2003), Portuguese footballer
- Sergio Bica (born 1983), Uruguayan footballer
- Adrian Bică Bădan (born 1988), Romanian footballer

== BICA ==
- Bahamas Institute of Chartered Accountants, a professional association
- Banque Internationale pour la Centrafrique, a bank
- BICA Honduras, a non-profit environmental organization in Honduras
- Biologically inspired cognitive architectures, an artificial intelligence research project

== See also ==
- Ascensor da Bica, a funicular railway line in the civil parish of Misericórdia, Lisbon, Portugal
