= Santa Justa Lift =

Municipal elevator in Lisbon, Portugal

Santa Justa Elevator
- Elevador de Santa Justa
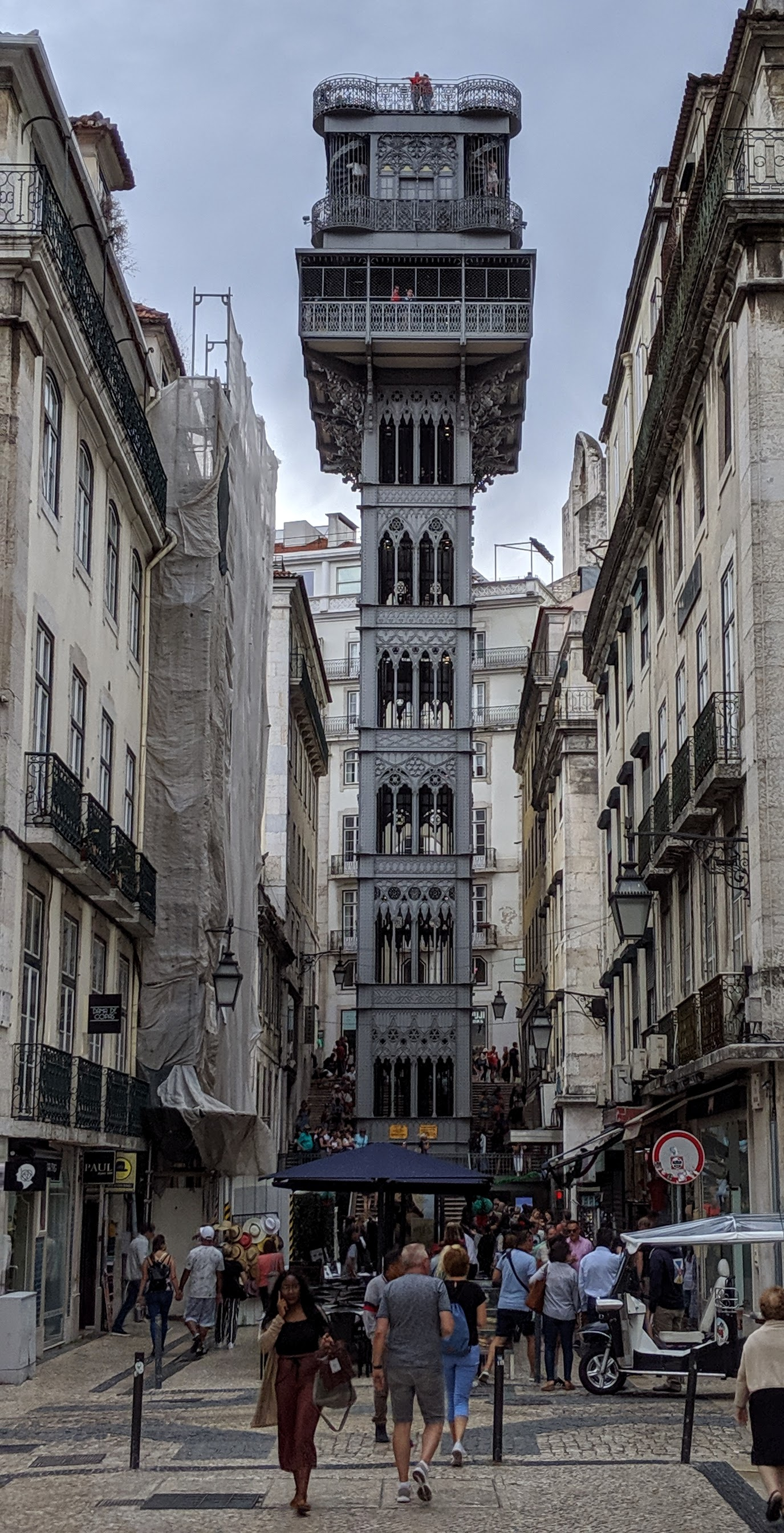
- The lift as seen from Rua de Santa Justa

General information
- Type: Elevator
- Architectural style: Neo-Gothic
- Location: Lisbon, Portugal
- Coordinates: 38°42′44″N 9°8′22″W
- Opened: c. 1899
- Owner: Portuguese Republic
- Operator: Carris

Height
- Height: 45 metres (148 ft)

Technical details
- Material: Iron

Design and construction
- Architect: Raoul Mesnier du Ponsard

Website
- Website

Portuguese National Monument
- Type: Non-movable
- Criteria: National Monument
- Designated: 19 February 2002
- Reference no.: IPA.00003146

The Santa Justa Lift (Portuguese: Elevador de Santa Justa, pronounced [elɨvɐˈðoɾ ðɨ ˈsɐ̃tɐ ˈʒuʃtɐ]), also called Carmo Lift (Portuguese: Elevador do Carmo, [elɨvɐˈðoɾ ðu ˈkaɾmu]), is an elevator, or lift, in the civil parish of Santa Maria Maior, in the historic center of Lisbon, Portugal. Situated at the end of Rua de Santa Justa, it connects the lower streets of the Baixa with the higher Largo do Carmo (Carmo Square).

Since its construction the lift has become a tourist attraction for Lisbon as, among the urban lifts in the city, Santa Justa is the only remaining vertical (conventional) one. Others, including Elevador da Glória and Elevador da Bica, are actually funicular railways, and the other lift constructed around the same time, the Elevator of São Julião, has since been demolished.

== History ==
The hills of Lisbon have always presented a problem for travel between the lower streets of the main Baixa and the higher Largo do Carmo (Carmo Square). In order to facilitate the movement between the two, the civil and military engineer Roberto Arménio presented a project to the Lisbon municipal council in 1874. A similar project was suggested in 1876, that included rail-lines that would be pulled by animals up an inclined plane.

In May 1882 founder and representative of the Companhia dos Ascensores Mecânicos de Lisboa, Raoul Mesnier du Ponsard, petitioned the city council for permission to explore alternative plans for constructing an inclined transport moved by mechanical means. On 1 June 1882, Mesnier, a Porto-born engineer of French parentage, was granted a licence to proceed.

In 1896 Mesnier petitioned for the concession of this project, in order to establish the Escadinhas de Santa Justa, a request that was contested by Henry Lusseau. At the same time, the Serviços de Obras da Câmara (Municipal Public Services) supported Mesnier's petition, and the concession to authorize the construction and exploration of the Raoul Mesnier du Ponsard Elevator was approved. It took two years to receive a provisional license to construct the structure. In 1899, the Empresa do Elevador do Carmo (Company of the Elevator of Carmo) was founded (constituted by principal partners Raoul Mesnier du Ponsard, medical surgeon João Silvestre de Almeida and the Marquess of Praia e Monforte, António Borges de Medeiros Dias da Câmara e Sousa) in order to secure the permanent concession of the elevator project for a period of 99 years.

In 1900, the formal contract was signed between the Municipal Council of Lisbon and the Empresa do Elevador do Carmo (extinct in 1939), on which the working group was obligated to present a project for an elevator in a period of six months; planning on the construction had already begun with the Lisbon branch of the metal constructors Cardoso D'Argent & Cia. (founded in 1897), on Rua Da Junqueira. The founder, Manuel Cardoso, had already been placed in charge of the offices of firm Empresa Industrial Portuguesa and was responsible for the workers in the Elevador de Santa Justa project. By the middle of the year, the land that would be the main site was already in movement, establishing the footings and equipment house (2 June of the same year).

On 31 August 1901, King Carlos inaugurated the metal bridge and awning, in a ceremony that included members of the royal family, the members of the elevator company, Raoul Mesnier du Ponsard, and various members of the nobility and journalists. Its initial operation was delayed: the operating car was only inaugurated on 10 July 1902 in the presence of the managing director of the concessionary company, Dr. Silvestre de Almeida, accompanied by journalists and other invited guests, in a ceremony presided over by the Secretary-General of the Civil Government.

The operating concession was given to the company Lisbon Electric Tramway Ltd. in 1905. Originally powered by steam, the lift was converted to electrical operation in 1907 by the British company R. Waygood, and the respective concessionary company bought the Elevator in 1913, from the Empresa do Elevador do Carmo.

=== Republic ===
In 1943, the Lisbon Electric Tramway Ltd. solicited the city council to authorize the transfer of the elevator to the Companhia da Carris. The process was approved, with the condition that its operation should be integrated into the transport network, with the Companhia da Carris as the principal.

By 1973, a contract was signed between the municipal council of Lisbon, the Companhia da Carris and the Lisbon Electric Tramway Ltd., transferring the Elevator definitively into the city's historical tram network.

In July 2002, the Santa Justa Elevator celebrated its first centenary; along with the three remaining cable railways of Lavra, Glória and Bica, they were all classified as National Monuments in the same year.

After remodelling and renovation, the elevator walkway was reopened in February 2006 for the general public and tourists.

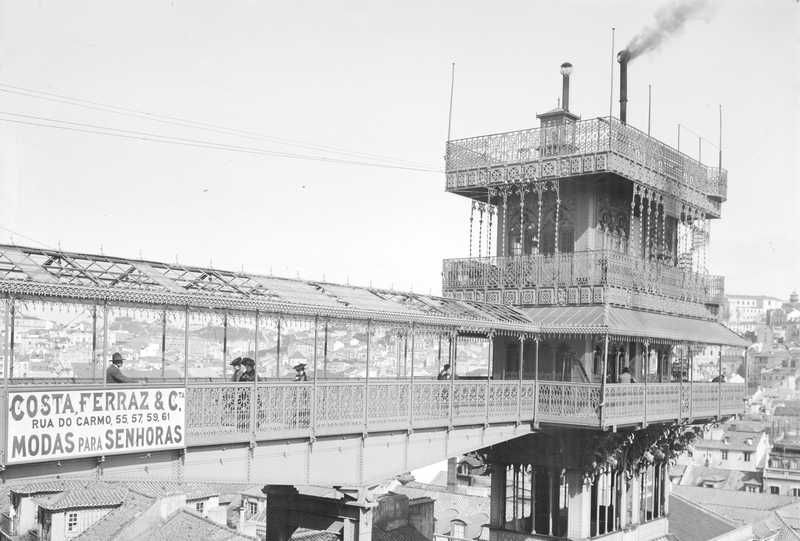
A photograph of the Santa Justa Lift, as it appeared prior to a 1907 conversion to electric power.

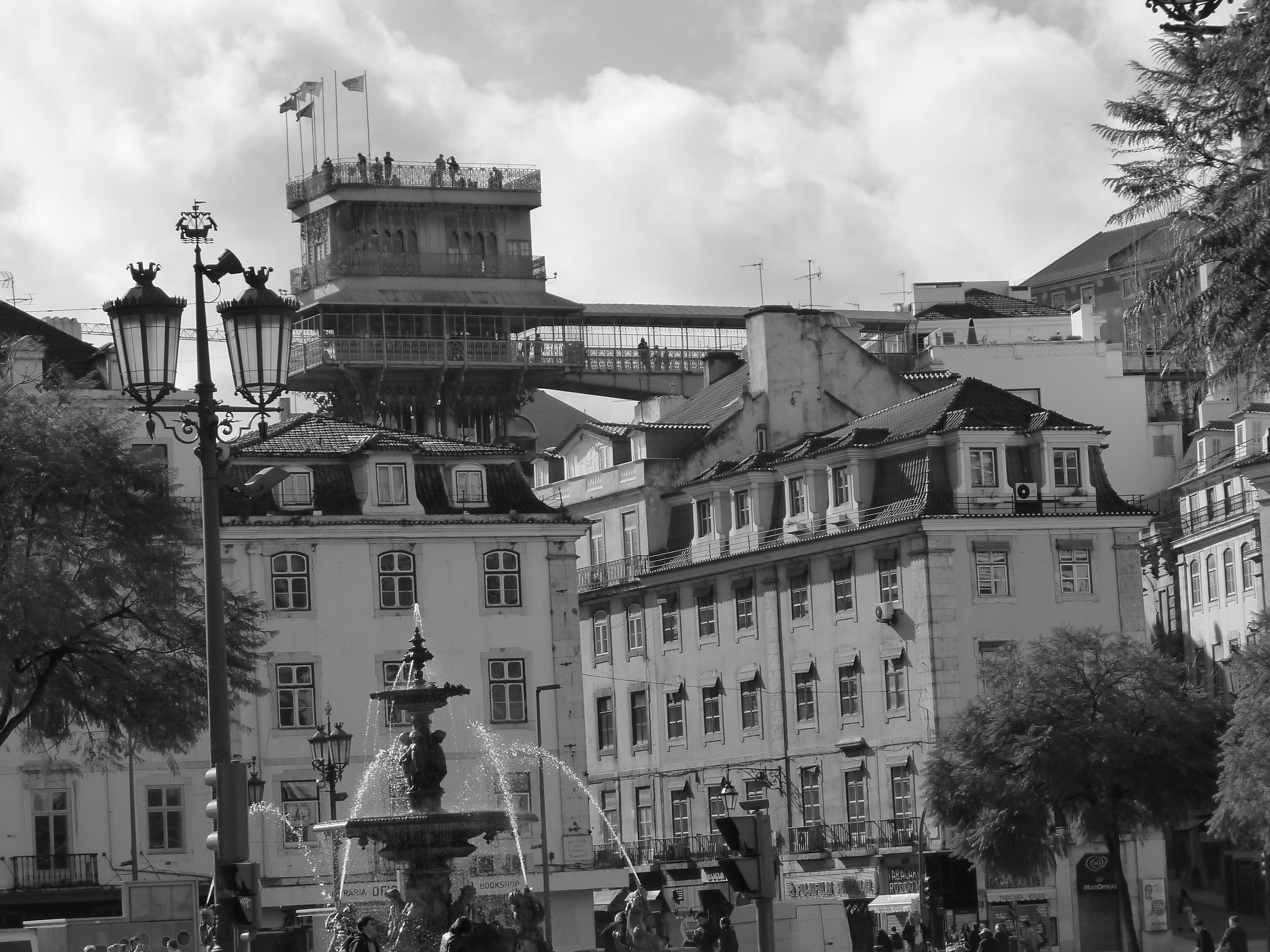
The Santa Justa Lift, as seen from the Praça D.Pedro IV

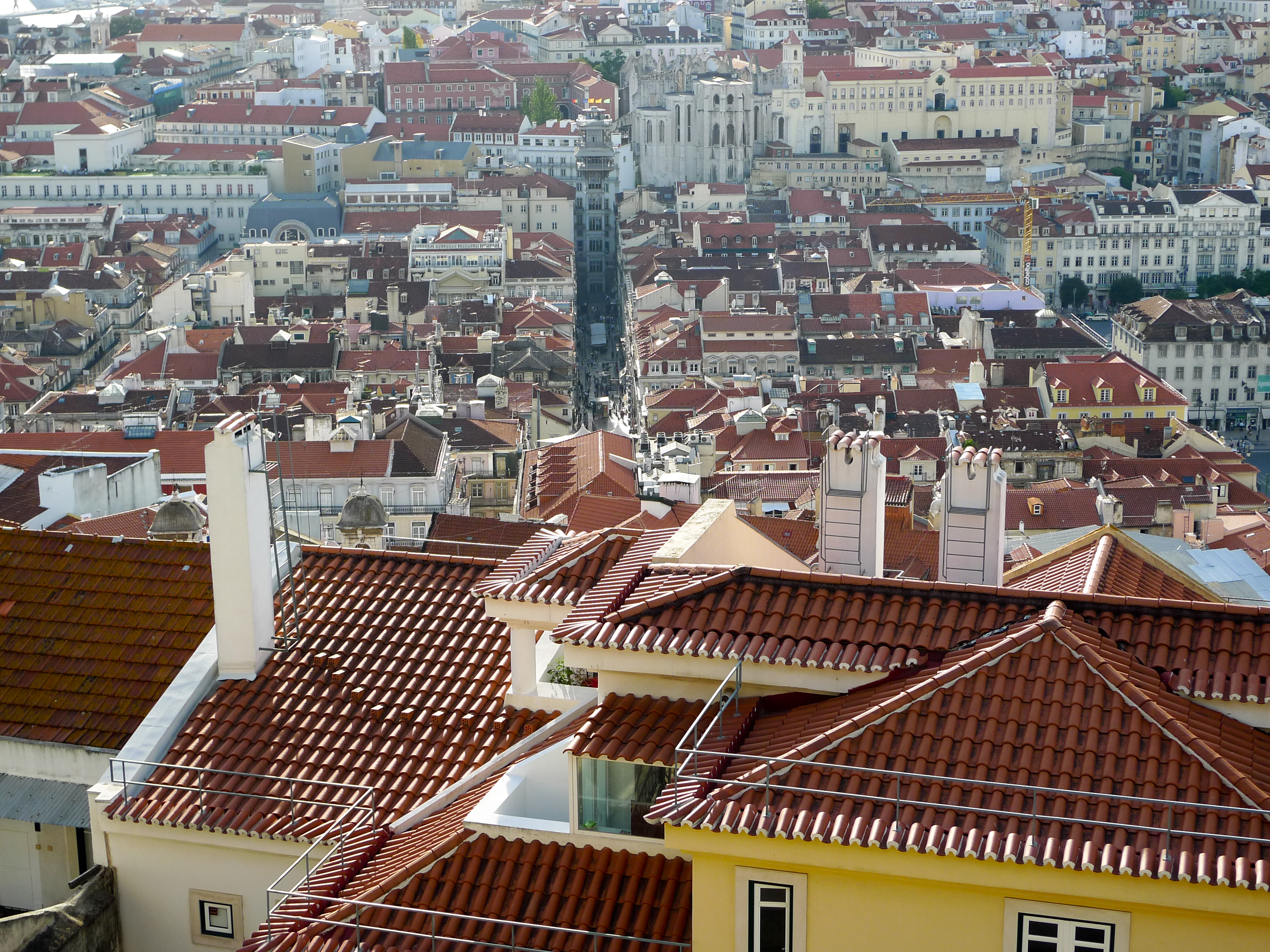
The location of the Santa Justa Lift, within the buildings of the Baixa Pombalina in Sacramento

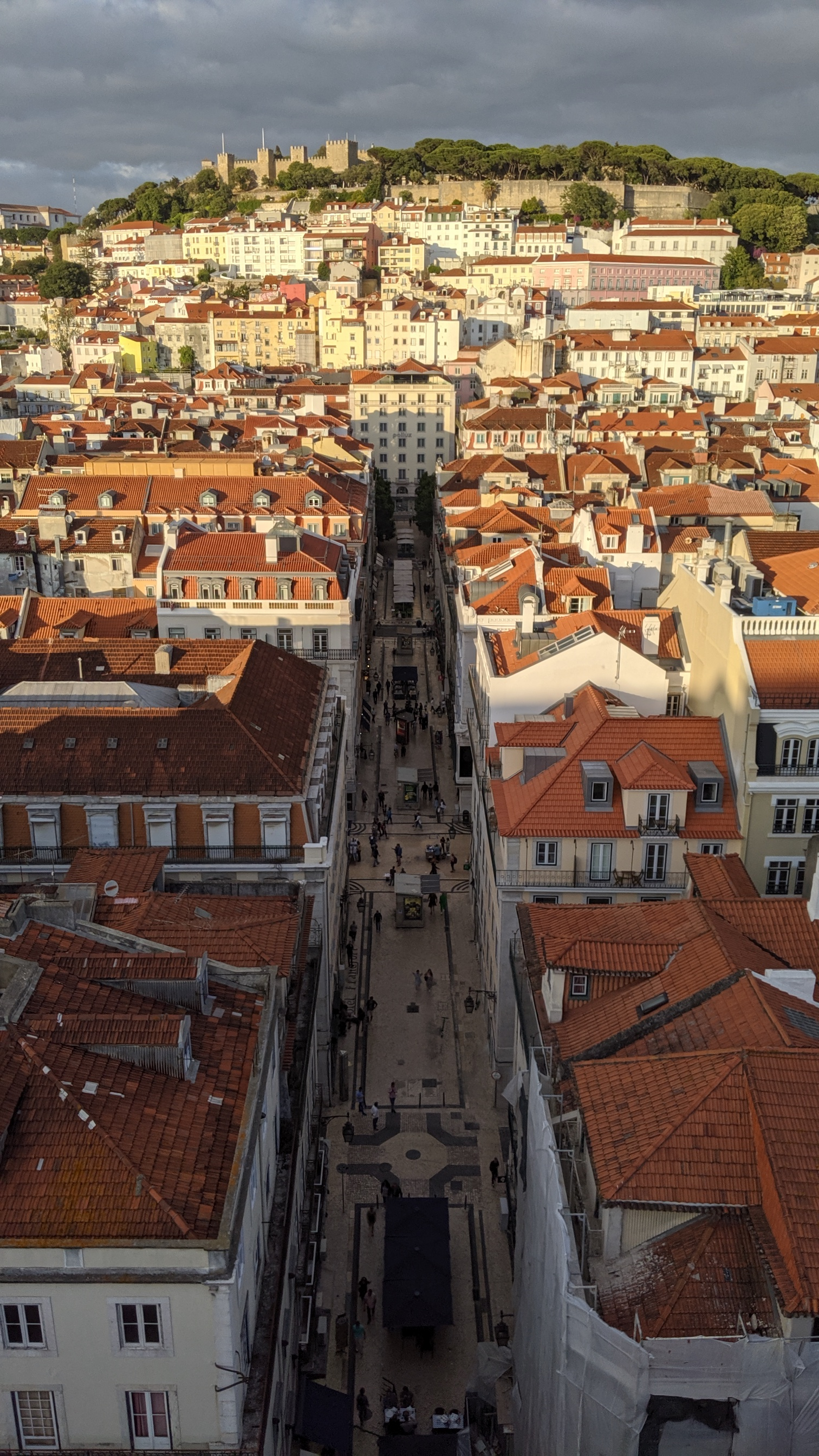
View of Castelo de São Jorge and Rua de Santa Justa from the observation deck above the lift

== Architecture ==
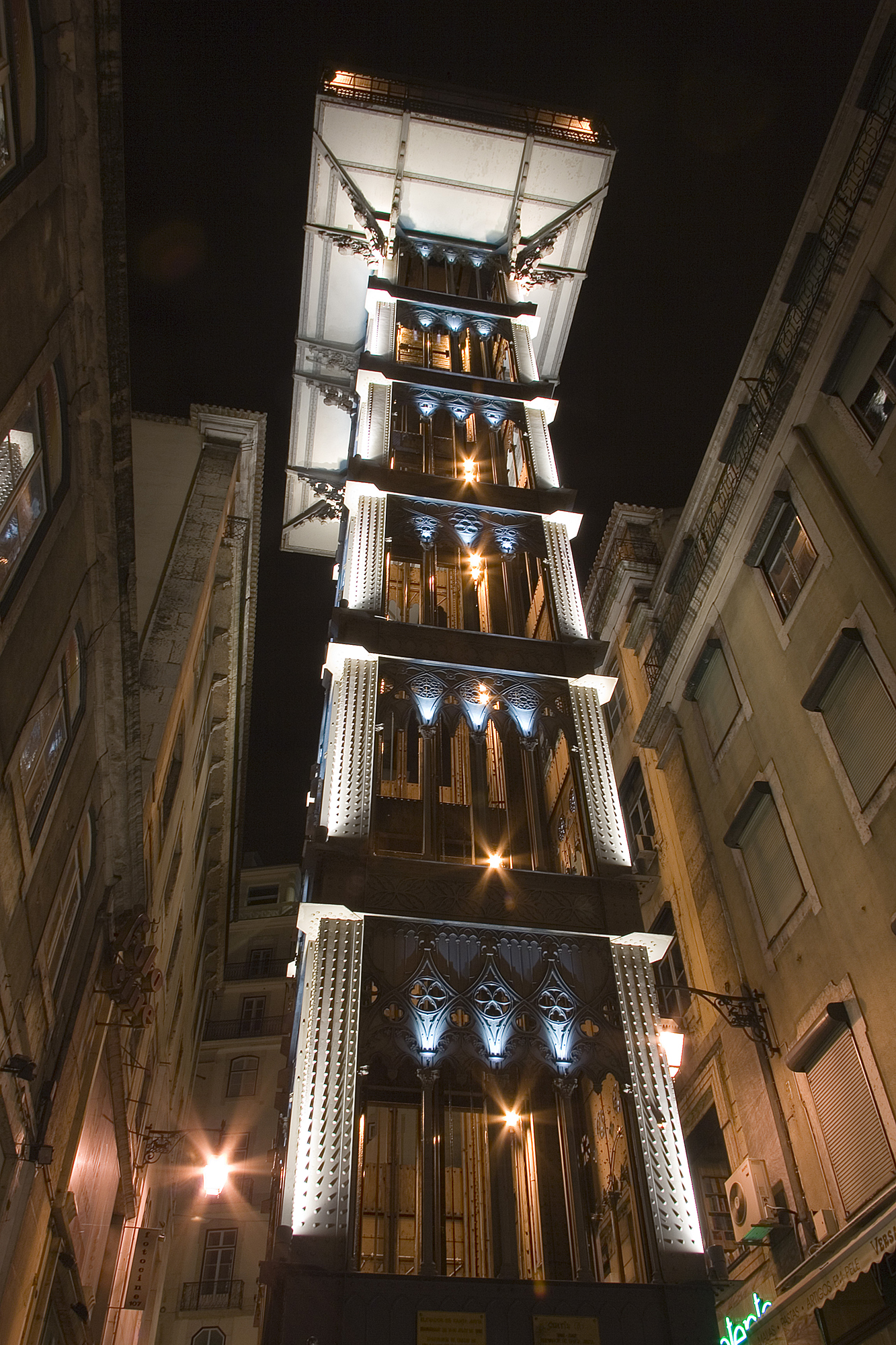
An image of the Santa Justa Lift in the evening

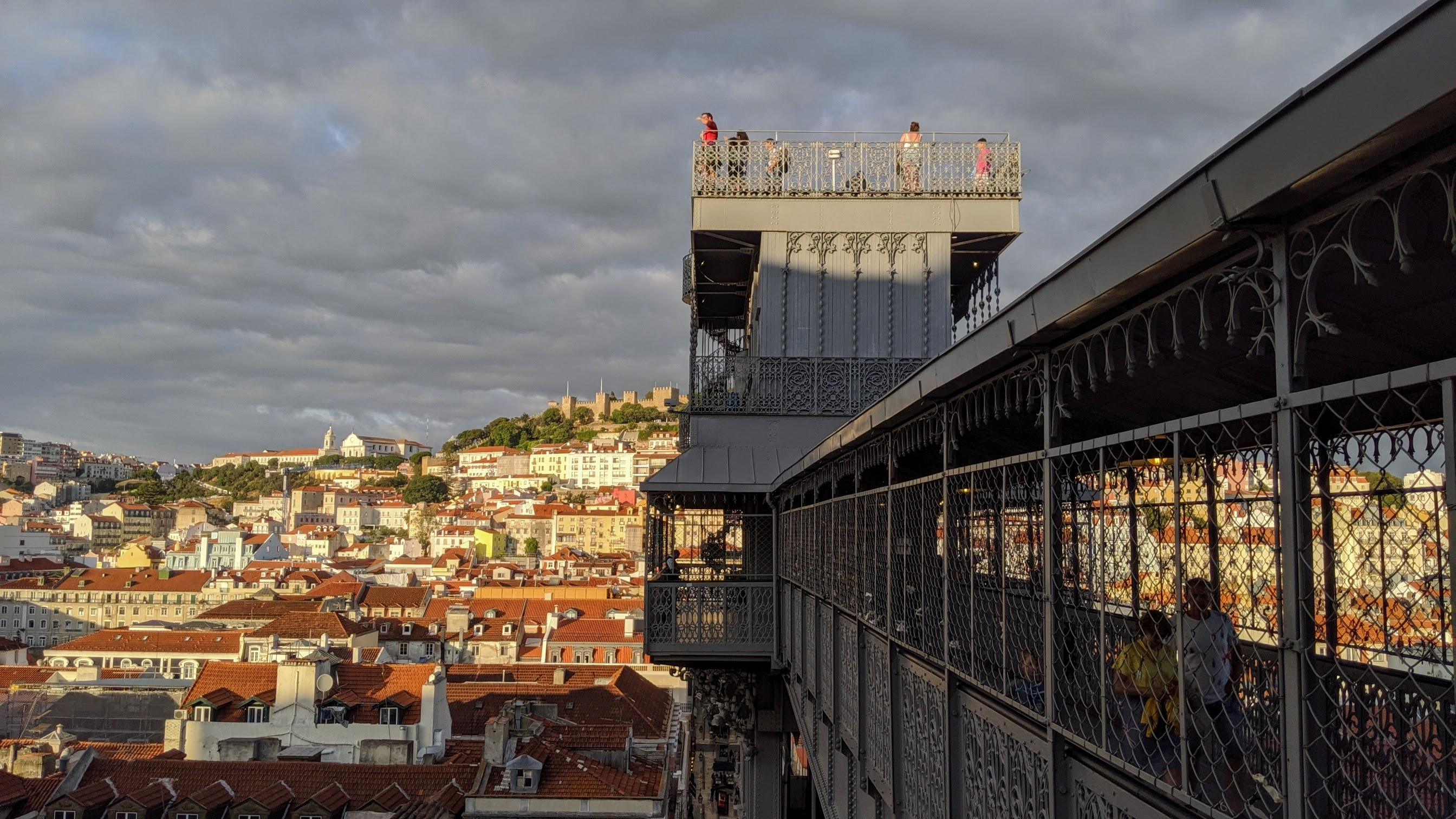
The terrace and walkway of the lift, with observation deck

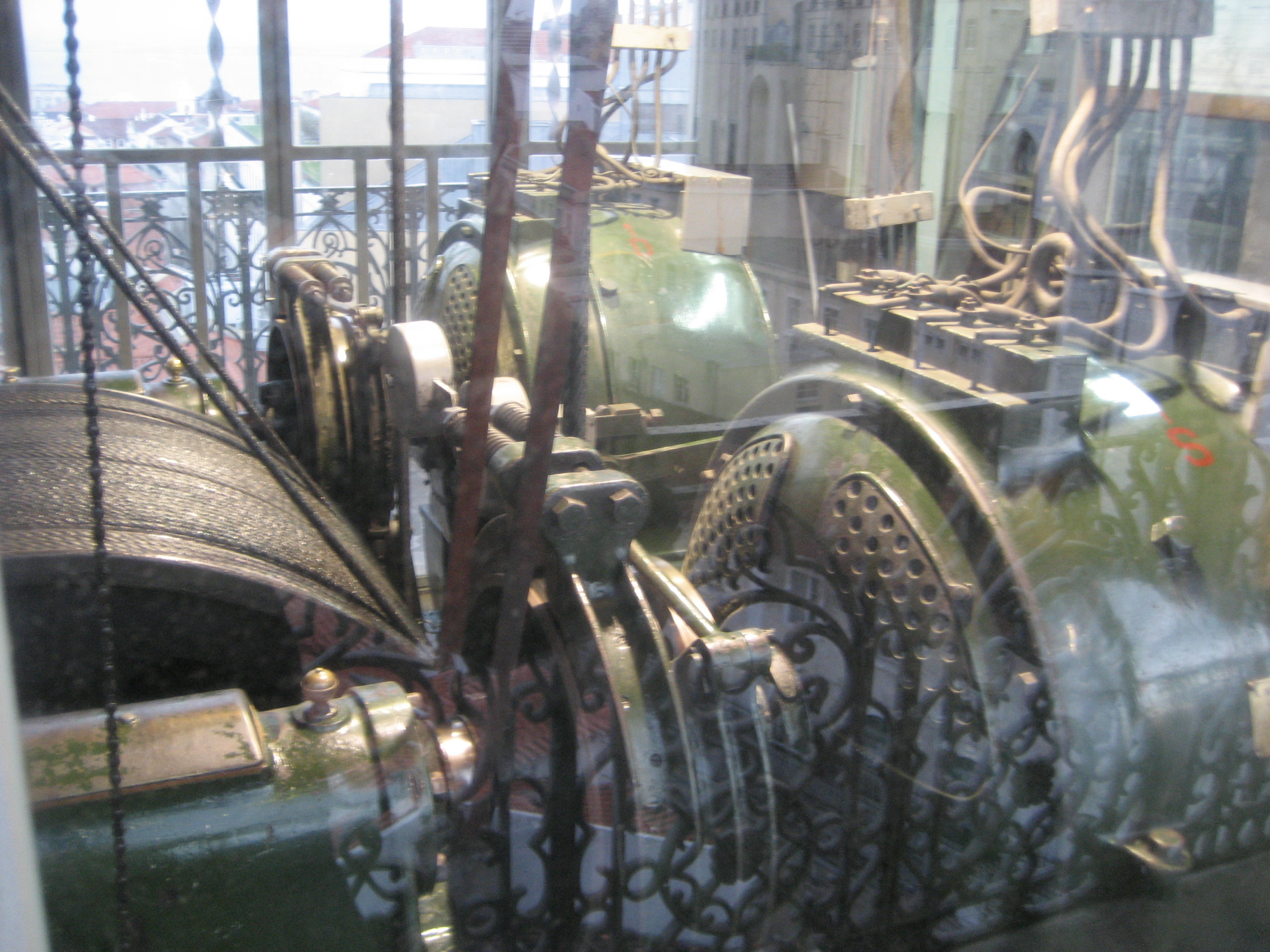
Santa Justa Lift engines

The lift is included on the historical guides of Lisbon, within the down-town Pombaline Baixa area between several older historical buildings in the quarter. It is situated in the Escadinhas de Santa Justa which connects the Baixa to the Rua do Carmo. The Escadinhas are actually part of the north-eastern urban wall of the Baixa and west of the Rua de Santa de Justa. The elevator gives access to many of the important zones of the city. To the north, towards the Rossio (Praça D. Pedro IV and Avenida da Liberdade); to the south, the (Terreiro do Paço) Praça do Comércio and the river zone; while in the upper zone, there is access to the Largo do Carmo, the Trindade, Church of São Roque and the Bairro Alto quarter. In addition, the panoramic views allow glimpses of the Castle of São Jorge, the Tagus River, the lower part of the Baixa, the National Theatre D. Maria II, while the upper entrance permits a view of the ruins of the Monastery of Nossa Senhora do Vencimento do Monte do Carmo.

The elevator is a vertical structure, developed along the Rua de Santa Justa, consisting of a metal tower, observation platform, walkway and base. Its base includes four vertical columns, each composed of two pillars. The largest part of the structure runs parallel to the Rua de Santa Justa. With a height of 45 metres, covering seven stories, the tower includes two elevator cabins, decorated in wood, mirrors and windows, and with an initial capacity for 24 passengers in each (updated to 29 people later). The structure includes a dozen transverse beams, forming a double lattice, supported at the top by foundations at the Escadinhas de Santa Justa. On the sides of the elevator, the walkway is articulated by means of bearings, as well as on the pillars, which is articulated at the base.

The top floor is a lookout, with panoramic views of the city, while connections to the floors below are made (in addition to the elevator) by two spiral staircases, with different patterns on each storey. The main machinery was installed at the base of the Elevator, while at the exit to the Largo do Carmo there is a veranda to allow circulation. The corridor that passes above the structure, was transformed into a terrace, and exits to Largo do Carmo through an iron gate. The space destined the electrical equipment was located under the Escadinhas, in a space set aside for this purpose, under a vaulted ceiling.

The lift is decorated in a Neo-Gothic style in iron. Since iron was a new building material at the time of its construction, it is symbolic of the technical and memorial construction from this period, representing the culture of the 1900s, when the structure and elevators were considered a major innovation and portent of a modern age.

== See also ==
- Polanco Lift in Valparaíso, Chile
- Katarina Elevator in Stockholm, Sweden

== Bibliography ==
- Dias, Marina Tavares (1888), Lisboa desaparecida (in Portuguese) (3rd ed.), Lisbon, Portugal
- Viterbo, Francisco de Sousa (1922), Dicionário histórico e documental dos arquitectos e engenheiros e construtores portugueses (in Portuguese), Lisbon, Portugal
- Sequeira, Gustavo de Matos (1939), O Carmo e a Trindade, subsídios para a história de Lisboa (in Portuguese), Lisbon, Portugal
- Sande e Castro, António Paes (1955), A Carris e a expansão de Lisboa, subsídios para a história dos transportes colectivos na cidade de Lisboa (in Portuguese), Lisbon, Portugal
- Costa, Mário (1965), O Chiado pitoresco e elegante. História, figuras, usos e costumes (in Portuguese), Lisbon, Portugal
- França, José Augusto (1967), A arte em Portugal no século XIX (in Portuguese), Lisbon, Portugal
- Andersen, W.O. A (1969), Revolução Industrial (in Portuguese), Lisbon, Portugal
- Almeida, Fernando de (1973), Monumentos e Edifícios Notáveis do Distrito de Lisboa (in Portuguese), vol. I, Lisbon, Portugal
- Capitão, Maria Amélia da Motta (1974), Subsídios para a História dos Transportes Terrestres em Lisboa no século XIX (in Portuguese), Lisbon, Portugal
- França, José Augusto (1978), A arte portuguesa de oitocentos (in Portuguese), Lisbon, Portugal
- França, José Augusto (1978), A reconstrução de Lisboa e a arquitectura pombalina (in Portuguese), Lisbon, Portugal
- Arquitectura de Engenheiros, séculos XIX e XX (in Portuguese), Lisbon, Portugal, 1980
- Catálogo de Exposição (in Portuguese), Serviço de Museu e Serviço de Exposições e Museografia, May–June 1980
- Custódio, Jorge; Barros, G. Monteiro (1984), O ferro de Moncorvo e o seu aproveitamento através dos tempos (in Portuguese)
- Anacleto, Regina (1986), "Neoclassicismo e Romantismo", História da Arte em Portugal (in Portuguese), vol. 10, Lisbon, Portugal
- Rio de Carvalho, Manuel (1986), "Do Romantismo ao Fim do Século", História da Arte em Portugal (in Portuguese), vol. 11, Lisbon, Portugal
- Almeida, Pedro Vieira de; Fernandes, José Manuel (1986), "Arquitectura Moderna", História da Arte em Portugal (in Portuguese), vol. 14, Lisbon, Portugal
- Estrela, Leite (1986), Lisboa a cidade dos elevadores (in Portuguese), Lisbon, Portugal
- Ferreira, Fátima (1987), Guia Urbanístico e Arquitectónico de Lisboa (in Portuguese), Lisbon, Portugal
- Cardoso, Alberico (1989), Chiado, meu Amor (in Portuguese), Lisbon, Portugal
- Passos, José Manuel da Silva (1990), O bilhete postal ilustrado e a história urbana de Lisboa (in Portuguese), Lisbon, Portugal
- Fernandes, José Manuel (1991), A Arquitectura do princípio do século em Lisboa (1900-1925) (in Portuguese), Lisbon, Portugal
- Araújo, Norberto de (1993), Peregrinações em Lisboa (in Portuguese) (2nd ed.), Lisbon, Portugal
- Atlas de Lisboa, a cidade no espaço e no tempo (in Portuguese), Lisbon, Portugal, 1993
- Lagrange, José (1993), O livro da Carris (in Portuguese), Lisbon, Portugal
- Lisboa em movimento, 1850-1920 (in Portuguese), Lisbon, Portugal, 1994
- Pedreirinho, José Manuel (1994), Dicionário dos arquitectos activos em Portugal do século I à actualidade (in Portuguese), Porto, Portugal
- Delgado, Maria Helena (1997), A decoração do Elevador de Santa Justa na obra do Engenheiro Raoul Mesnier du Ponsard, dissertação de mestrado (in Portuguese), Lisbon, Portugal: University Lusíada
- Tudella, José (12 February 2006), "O Passadiço do Elevador do Carmo", Público (in Portuguese)
