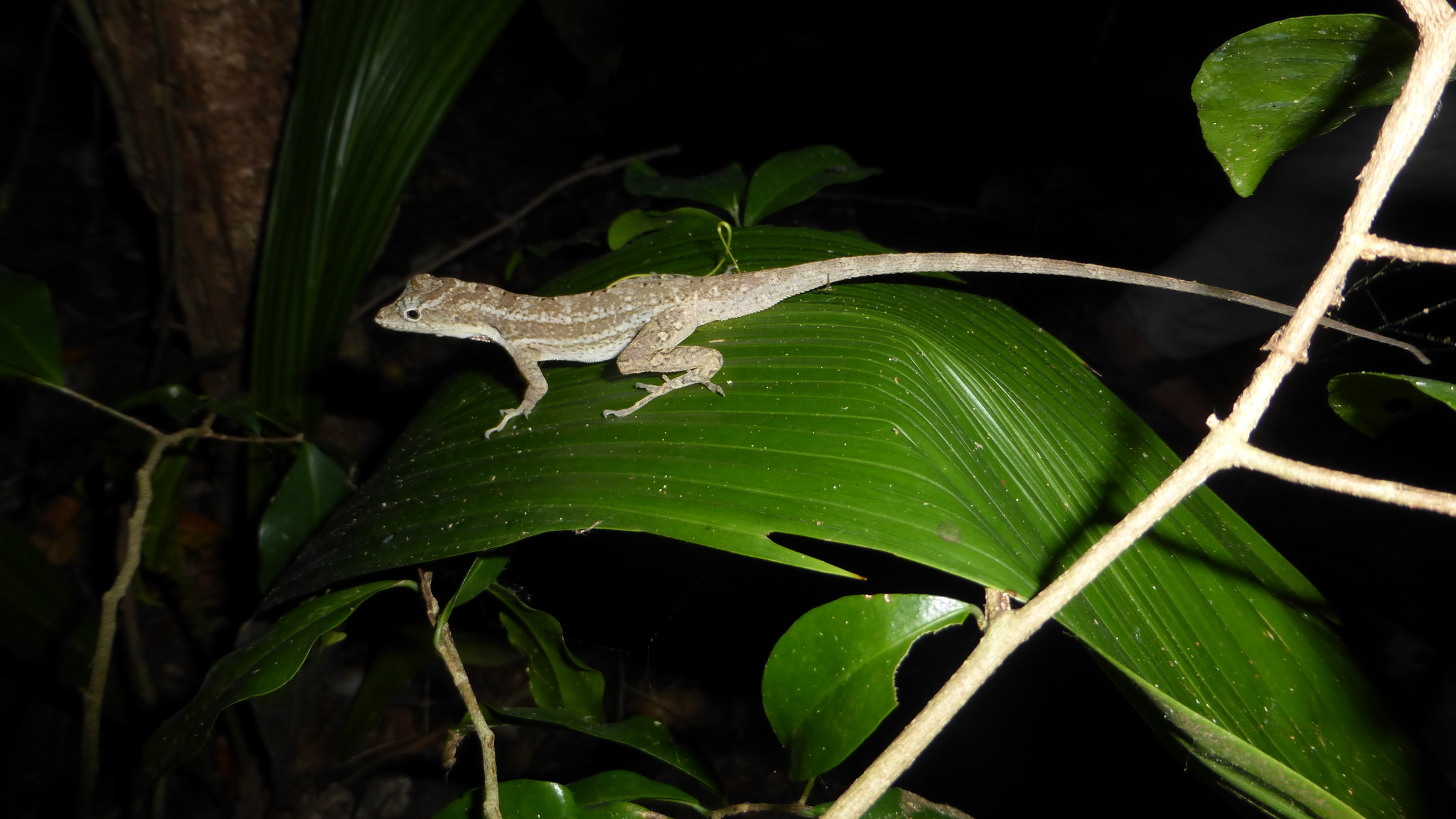

Conservation status
- Critically Endangered (IUCN 3.1)

Scientific classification
- Kingdom: Animalia
- Phylum: Chordata
- Class: Reptilia
- Order: Squamata
- Suborder: Iguania
- Family: Dactyloidae
- Genus: Anolis
- Species: A. bicaorum

Binomial name
- Anolis bicaorum (G. Köhler, 1996)

Synonyms
- Norops bicaorum G. Köhler, 1996; Anolis bicaorum — G. Köhler et al., 2007

= Anolis bicaorum =

Species of lizard

Anolis bicaorum, also known commonly as the Bay Islands anole, is a species of lizard in the family Dactyloidae. The species is endemic to Honduras.

== Etymology ==
The specific name, bicaorum (genitive, plural), is in honor of the members of BICA (Bay Islands Conservation Association) of Honduras.

== Taxonomy ==
A. bicaorum is in the A. auratus species group, and is closest to A. lemurinus.

== Description ==
Medium-sized for its genus, A. bicaorum may attain a snout-to-vent length of 7.5 cm (3.0 in). It is long-limbed and has a large dewlap. Its body is brownish, and its dewlap is blackish with a red margin and oblique rows of white scales.

== Reproduction ==
A. bicaorum is oviparous.
