= Nazaré Funicular =

- Ascensor da Nazaré
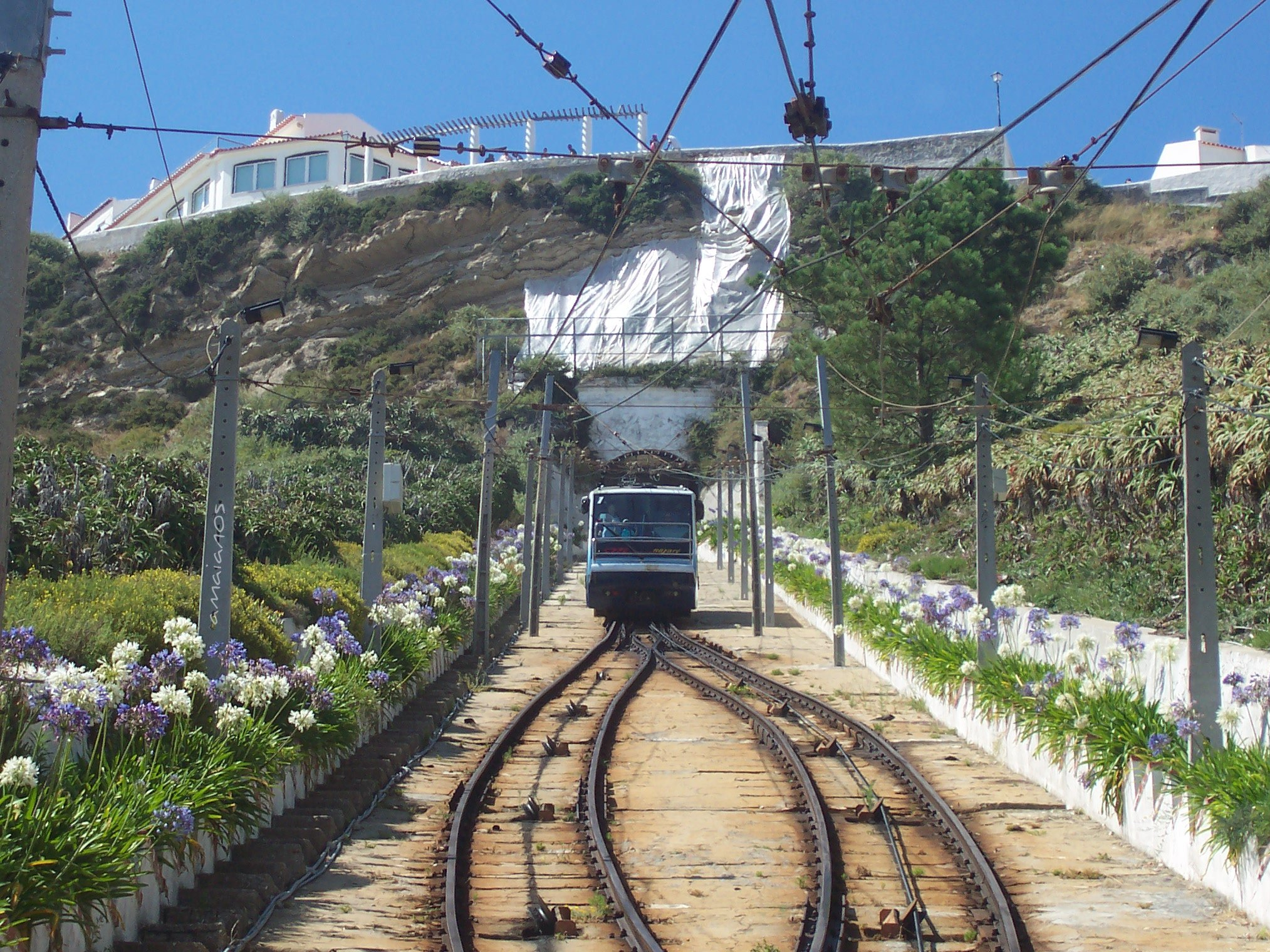
- A view of one of the modern cars descending from the tunnel
- Interactive map of the Nazaré Funicular area

General information
- Type: Funicular
- Location: Nazaré, Portugal
- Coordinates: 39°36′18.1″N 9°4′27.9″W
- Opened: 28 July 1889
- Owner: Portuguese Republic

Technical details
- Material: Steel

Design and construction
- Architect: Raul Mesnier du Ponsard

Website
- https://www.sm-nazare.pt/ascensor/

The Nazaré Funicular (Portuguese: Ascensor da Nazaré) is a funicular situated in the civil parish of Nazaré, Portugal, municipality of Nazaré, in the portuguese Oeste region.

== History ==
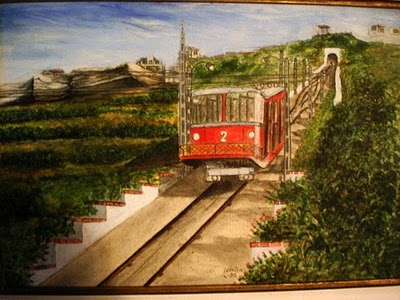
A painting of the former red livery cars as seen in the 1920s

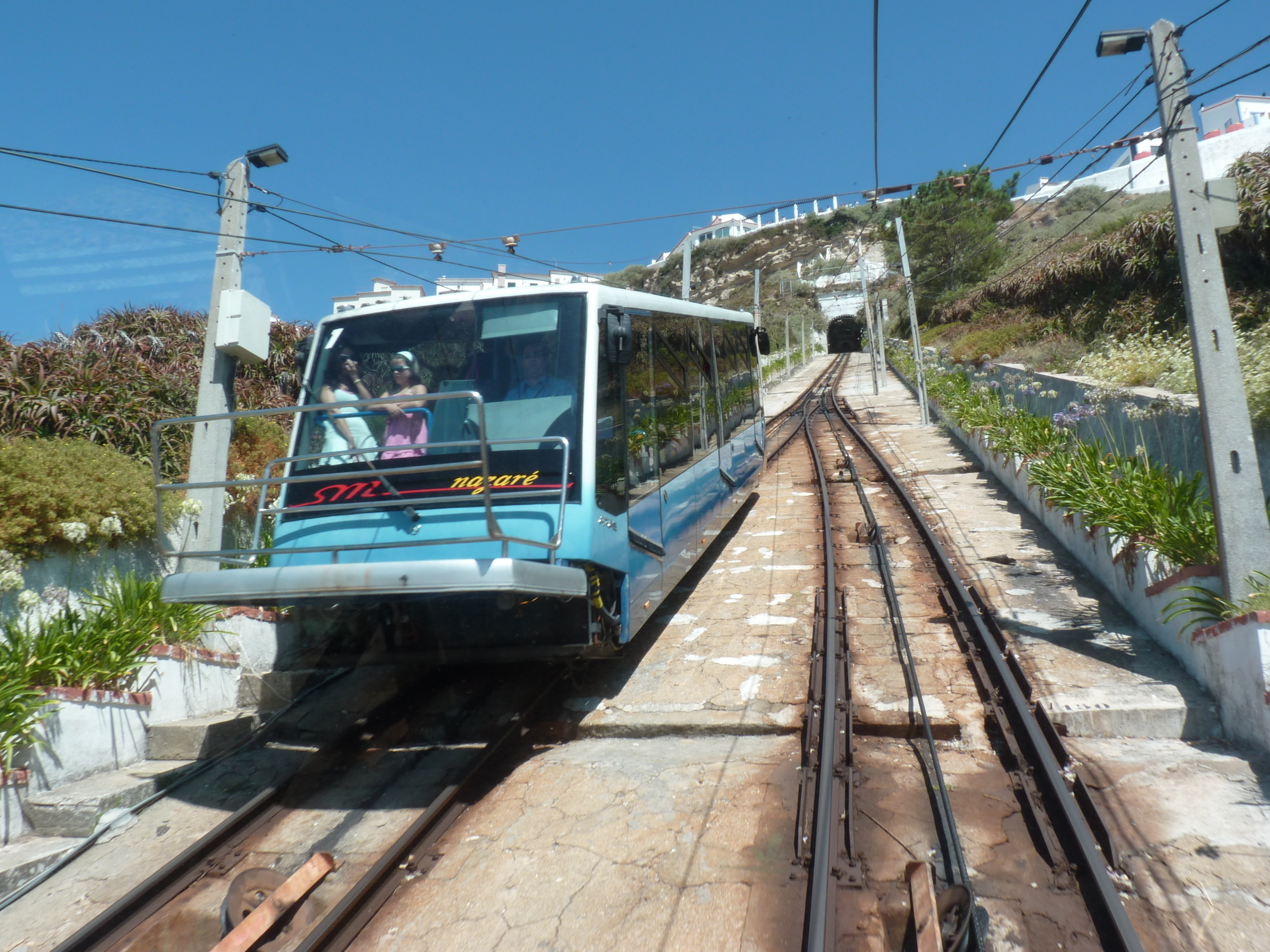
A view of the modernized carriages descending to Praia

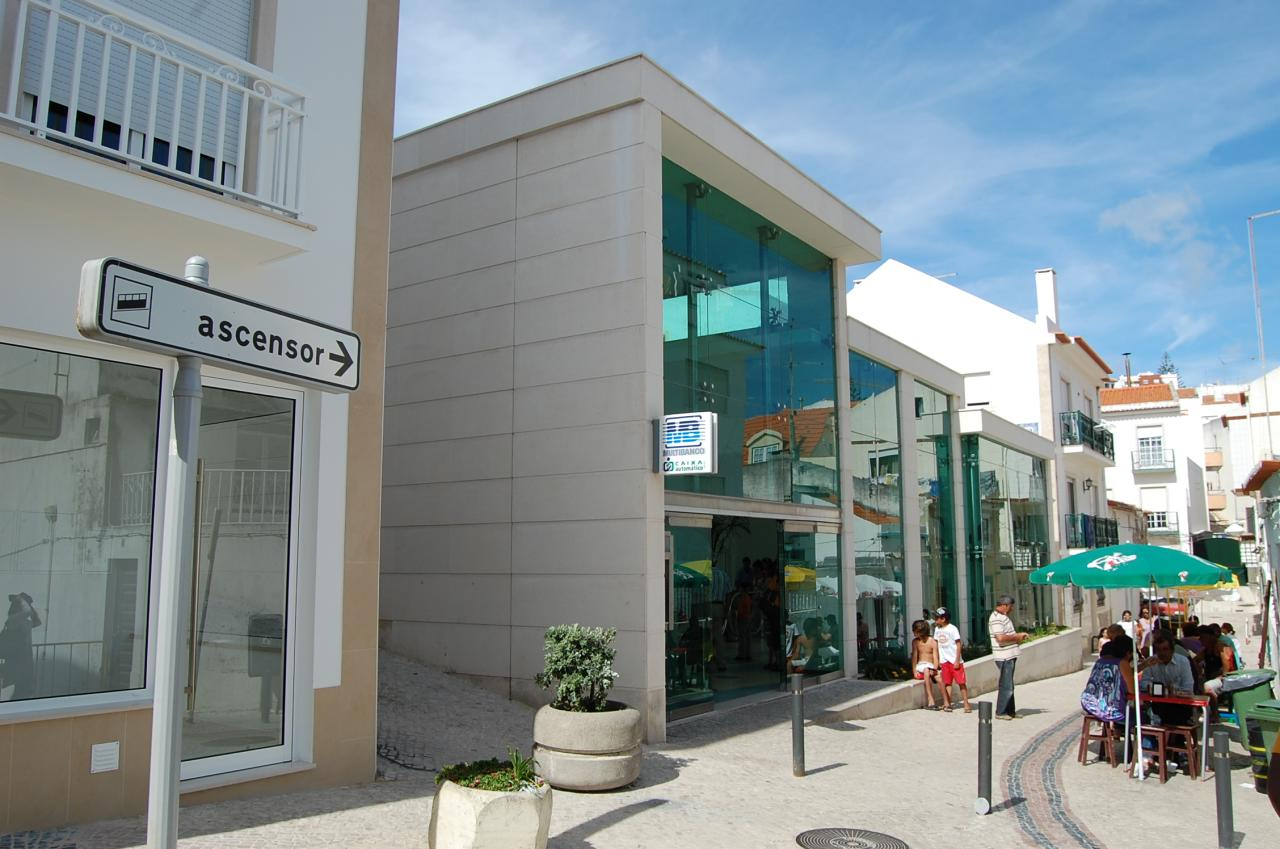
The modern facade of the lower Praia terminal station

From the description of Father Manuel de Brito Alão, the descent from Sítio to Ribeira da Pederneira was accomplished by a steep incline, of loose sand. Much of the nobility that visited the sanctuary of Nossa Senhora da Nazaré followed this road, seated on "carpets, that were pulled at the corners, along with their servants, safe and composed". This form of transport was used up to the 19th century. On 15 October 1888, a partnership was developed by Tavares Crespo, Francisco Morais, Joaquim Carneiro D’Alcáçovas de Sousa Chicharro, José Eduardo Ferreira Pinheiro, Barão de Kessler and engineer Raoul Mesnier du Ponsard to construct a funicular in Nazaré, with the entity seated in Lisbon. On 28 July 1889, the line was blessed and inaugurated as the funicular of Nossa Senhora da Nazaré, in honour of the Virgin Mary, protector of the town. At the event was the Ministro das Obras Públicas (Minister of Public Works) and the Ministro da Fazenda (Minister of Finances) and Dr. António Lúcio Tavares Crespo, then owner of the line.

Initially, the funicular was moved by a steam-powered machine situated in the area of Sítio, where the promontory overlooking the village led onto a 50 metres (160 ft) tunnel and ramp. The boiler was heated by wood, and since there were no fountains in Sítio, the water for the tank was transported from Praia by two cars.

The funicular line, with an extension of 318 metres (1,043 ft) and 42% slope, follows a channel between the promontory and beach, terminating at the Largo das Caldeiras. The lower terminal is protected by two lateral walls to prevent the invasion of sand. The mechanism, similar to the one used in the funicular of Lavra, came from Germany from the factory of Maschinenfabrik Esslingen. The cars used a red livery and transported 60 passengers, but only during the summer beach season, with trips operating between 6:00 a.m. and 9:00 p.m.

In 1918, an allotment of wood was ceded to the funicular to allow it to continue to operate.

On 1 October 1924, the funicular was acquired by the Real Casa, then dominated by the Confraria da Nossa Senhora da Nazaré, with the objective of operating for a year. This was to facilitate ease of access by religious people to the sanctuary of Nossa Senhora da Nazaré, and collect funds to maintain the Hospital de Nossa Senhora da Nazaré. In 1931, a report to the Minister requested authorization to sell to the funicular to the municipal council, along with the electrical station. On 19 December of the same year, the funicular was sold to the municipal council of Nazaré for $398,013.00.

On 15 February 1963, there was an accident, caused by the rupture of the cable that resulted in the death of two people, and injury to 50 others. The incident went to trial, but the accused were acquitted; the administrator of the municipal water services indicated that the accident was caused by deterioration resulting from water infiltration in the area around the cable. The funicular service was not reopened until 1 April 1968. The redesigned cars used a new traction system with an electric transmission that included a three-fold braking mechanism: automatic, hydro-electric pressure and manual.

In September 2001, the funicular was closed to complete repairs and modernize its cars, at a cost of 1.5 million Euros. The project included repair to the chassis structure, repairs to the architecture and functioning of the stations, as well as the substitution of the carriages. It was reopened on 24 June 2002, and began operating with a 15-minute turnaround.

== Architecture ==
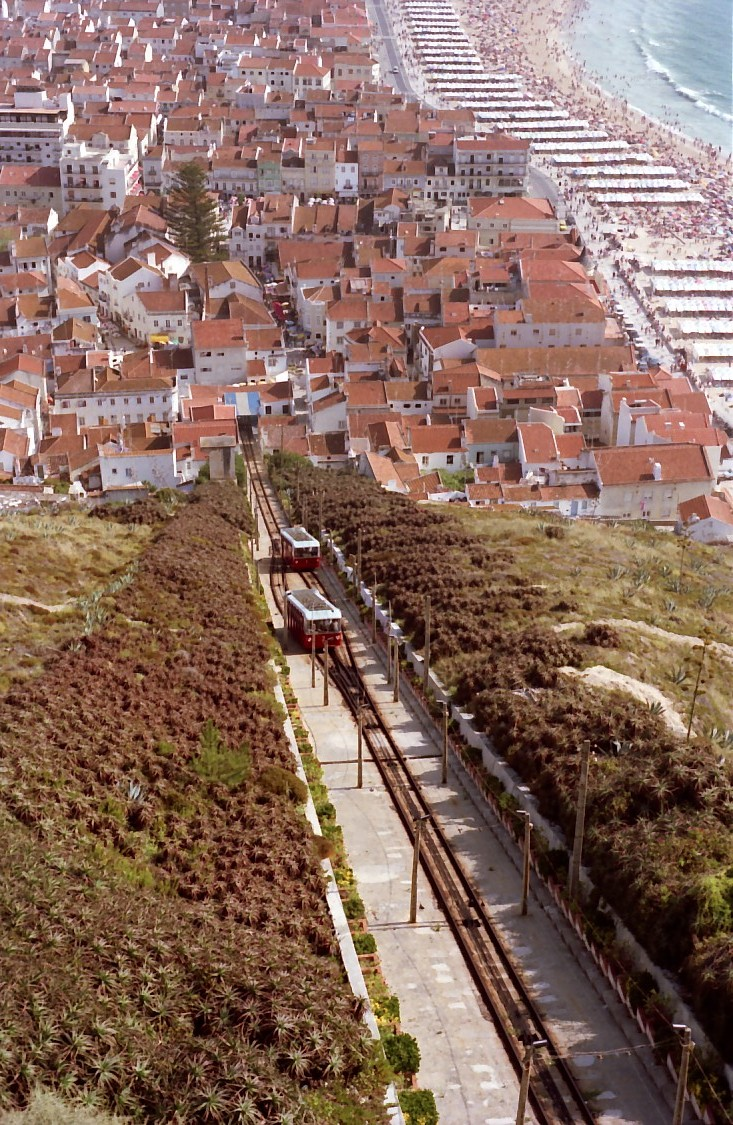
The line as seen from the overlook at Sítio, showing the older red-livery cars

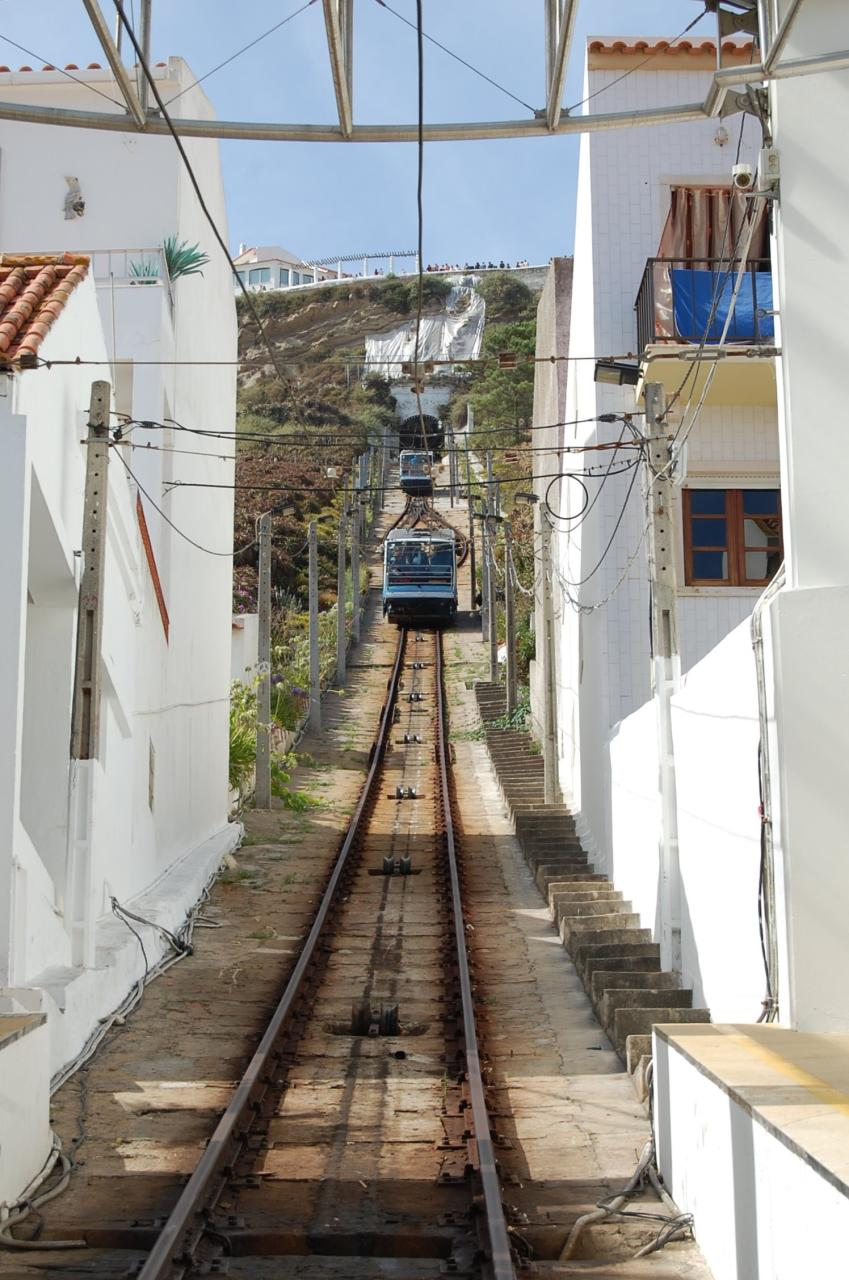
A view of the narrow passage between buildings on the lower area near the terminal building

The funicular is situated in an urban context, inclined along and dug into a steep promontory with a 42% slope connecting the settlements of Praia and Sítio, and provides a notable view of Nazaré. The terminals are built on a slope matching the track gradient. The Praia terminal joins the neighboring two facades, and the Sítio terminal is housed beside the street leading through the belvedere (with public bathrooms).

The system includes two cars, linked by a subterranean cable, that ascend and descend simultaneously along the line. At the beginning and end terminals, the tracks are shared, but separate along the descent/ascent, allowing them to pass at the midpoint. The main cable travels along the line powered by electricity. Each carriage is painted blue, and includes three interior compartments and three access doors with the extreme ends occupied by the driving sections. The central area is occupied by eight benches oriented longitudinally and four benches transversally.

Over the entrance to the terminal tunnel at Sítio is a panel of azulejo tile, in blue and white, with the representation of the funicular and marble plaque with the inscription:

Centenário do Ascensor / da Nazaré / 1889 - 1989 / 28 de Julho de 1989
Century anniversary of the funicular / of Nazaré / 1889 - 1989 / 28 July 1989

In the tunnel is another marble inscription:

À MEMÓRIA / DO / DR. ANTÓNIO L. TAVARES CRESPO / FUNDADOR DO ASCENSOR DA NAZARETH / INAUGURADO EM 28 DE JULHO DE 1889 / HOMENAGEM DOS SERVIÇOS MUNICIPAIS / 18-7-1998
In memoriam / of / Dr. António L. Tavares Crespo / Founder of the Nazaré Funicular / Inaugurated on 28 July 1889

In the vestibulo of the terminal, is a bronze low relief, flanked by two inscriptions:

SERVIÇOS MUNICIPALIZADOS DA CÂMARA MUNICIPAL DA NAZARÉ / Aos 28 dias do mês de Julho do ano de 2004, / data do 115º Aniversário do ascensor da Nazaré, / celebramos a conclusão das Obras de Recuperação e / Remodelção das Gares e Carruagens do Ascensor. / O Presidente do Conselho de Administração / dos Serviços Municipalizados da Nazaré / Eng. Jorge Codinha Antunes Barroso
Municipal Services of the Municipal Council of Nazaré / On the 28 day of the month of July of the year 2004 / date of the 115th Anniversary of the funicular of Nazaré, / we celebrate the conclusion of the Work of Recuperation and / Remodelling of the Stations and Funicular Carriages. / The President of the Administrative Council / of the Municipal Services of Nazaré / Eng. Jorge Codinha Antunes Barroso

The other, a bas relief authored by Ferreira da Silva, and integrated into the facade of the former-Hotel D. Fuas, reproduced and offered to the municipality of Nazaré by Luís Tereso Henriques (28 July 2004):

Milagre de Nª. Sª. da Nazaré / a D. Fuas Roupinho
Miracle of Our Lady of Nazaré / of D. Fuas Roupinho

== See also ==
- Cable car (railway)
- List of funicular railways
