= CCFL (disambiguation) =

CCFL is an initialism most commonly referring to Cold cathode fluorescent lamp.

CCFL may also refer to:

- Companhia Carris de Ferro de Lisboa, more commonly known as Carris
- Community College of the Finger Lakes, now known as Finger Lakes Community College
- Cape Coral, Florida, a city in Florida
