= Bom Jesus do Monte Funicular =

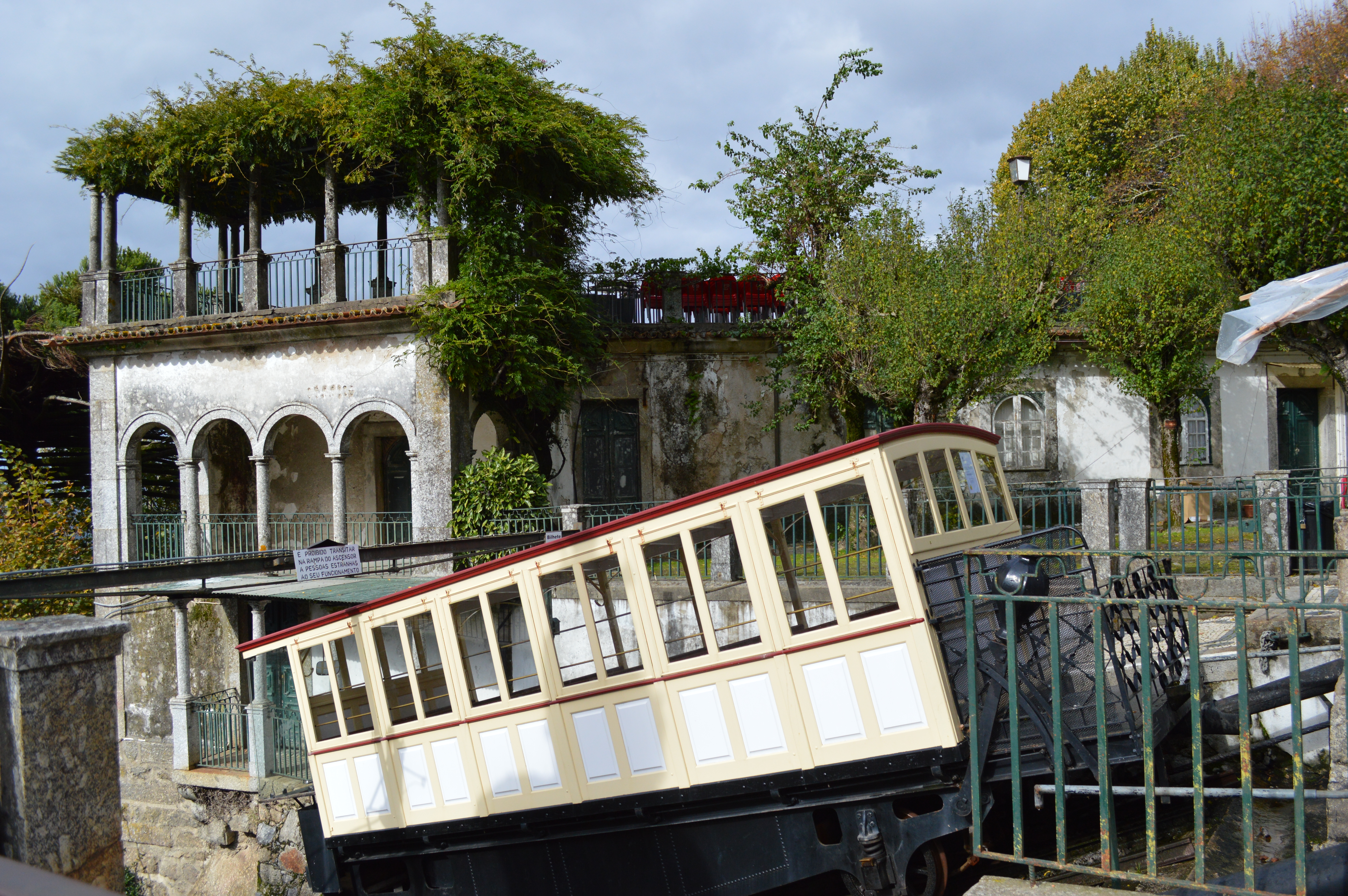
- A view of the upper station of the Bom Jesus Funicular showing tram and observation deck

Overview
- Native name: Elevador do Bom Jesus
- Locale: Nogueiró e Tenões, Braga
- Stations: 2
- Website: https://bomjesus.pt/bom-jesus/elevator-or-funicular/

Service
- Type: Funicular
- Services: 1

History
- Opened: 19th century (1880)

Technical
- Line length: 0.274 km (0.170 mi)
- Num of tracks: 2
- Track gauge: 1,435 mm (4 ft 8 1/2 in)

UNESCO World Heritage Site
- Part of: Sanctuary of Bom Jesus do Monte in Braga
- Criteria: Cultural: (iv)
- Reference: 1590
- Inscription: 2019 (43rd Session)

Portuguese National Monument
- Type: Non-movable
- Criteria: Monument of Public Interest
- Designated: 18 October 2012
- Reference no.: IPA.00021298

The Bom Jesus do Monte Funicular (Portuguese: Elevador do Bom Jesus do Monte), is a Portuguese funicular transport in civil parish of Nogueiró e Tenões, in the municipality of Braga, in the district of the same name. Operated by the Irmandade de Bom Jesus do Monte the funicular connects the upper-town of Braga with the Shrine on which it gets its name, over a distance that parallels the Escadaria de Bom Jesus (Bom Jesus staircase) to the highest point at the statue of Saint Longinus.

== History ==
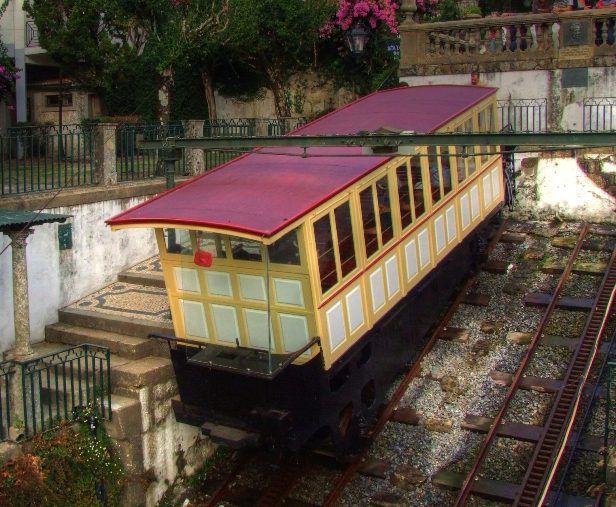
A view of one of the tram cars following the 2006 restoration

Construction on the tramway system began in April 1880, designed by Raoul Mesnier du Ponsard, under the direction of Swiss engineer Nikolaus Riggenbach, and financed by Bracarense businessman Manuel Joaquim Gomes, the principal shareholder of the Companhia de Carris of Braga. Gomes was interested in replacing the role of the horsecar (rail vehicles pulled by horses), which originally stretched to the Bom Jesus sanctuary, but was complemented by oxen up the steep hill on busy days. The trams were constructed by SLM - Oficinas de Olten.

Work began in March 1880, with Portuguese engineer of French descent Raoul Mesnier du Ponsard supervising the work. The funicular was inaugurated on 25 March 1882, and cost around 30 contos de réis. Its success was such that in the same year Mesnier was invited to design and install a series of funiculars and cable lifts in the Portuguese capital Lisbon, some of which are still in operation today.

In 1914, the Companhia de Carris was expropriated by the municipal council, resulting in the municipality exploiting the tourist transport. A campaign of restoration was carried out in 1946 using materials derived from the dismantling of the Monte Railway, in the city of Funchal, on the island of Madeira.

By the 1970s-1980s, the funicular passed to the responsibility of the Confraria do Bom Jesus do Monte.

On 13 March 2003, a dispatch was issued to classify the funicular as national heritage. In 2006 it underwent another restoration.

On 18 October 2012, the decision to classify the funicular transport as a Monumento de Interesse Público was issued (Diário da República, Série 2, 202, Announcement 13592/2012).

== Description ==
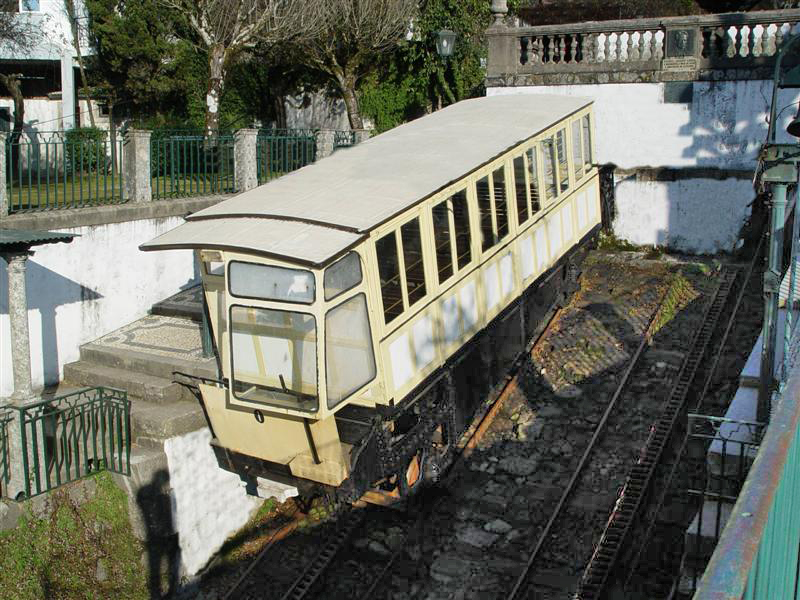
A car stopped at the upper station

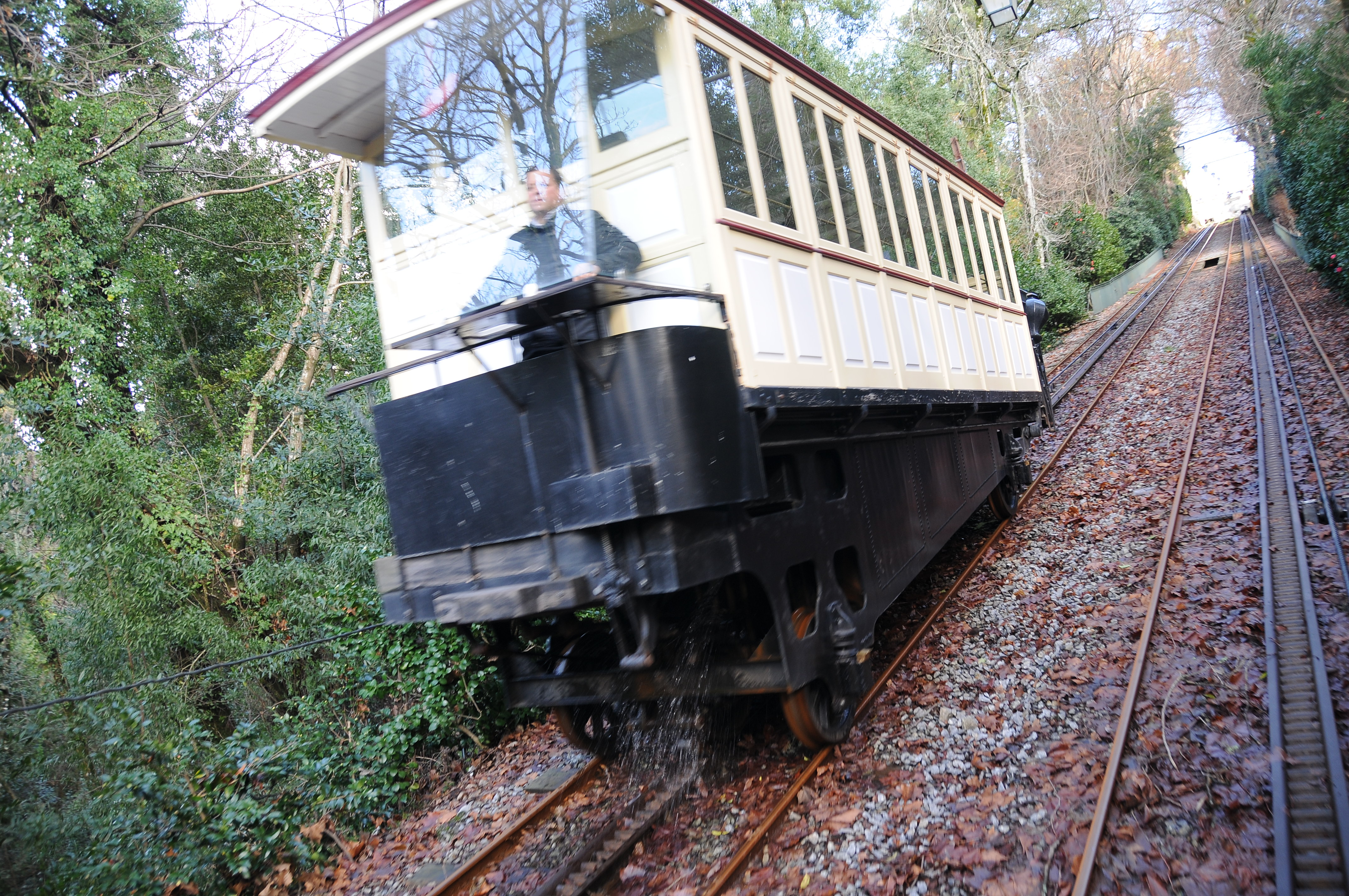
A car underway

The funicular is situated in a rural, isolated location surrounded by luxuriant vegetation, paralleling the Bom Jesus do Monte staircase, and connects the base of the hill with the sanctuary. The funicular's route crosses 274 metres (899 ft) along the flank of the hill, with an 42º incline, across a rise of 116 metres (381 ft).

It functions using two parallel 1,435 mm (4 ft 8 1/2 in) standard gauge tracks, each with its own tram and central rack, laid on wooden sleepers over stone ballast. The trams are connected by a steel cable. Each cabin is 7 metres (23 ft) long, 2 metres (6.6 ft) wide, and has a wheelbase of 4.5 metres (15 ft). The suspension system is made of four helical springs without dampers and hinged spiral-spring stop brakes. Each tram supports a capacity 30 seated passengers across six benches (that each seat five passengers), and up to eight standing passengers and the conductor.

Each cabin includes two water tanks, with the largest with a capacity of 5,850 litres (1,290 imp gal) that functions as a counterweight and supports a refrigeration circuit for the brakes, and a small tank with a capacity of 216 litres (48 imp gal) that supports the rear brakes. Both trams run in opposite directions, arriving at their opposite stops simultaneously. It is the oldest funicular in the world moved by water balancing, loading water into the car at the top of the hill, weighing it down so it descends to the bottom, at the same time drawing the lighter, drained car up the hill, where the process starts all over again: the trip takes between 2.4 and 4 minutes.

=== Stations ===
The base terminal is a rectangular stop, comprising three bodies with the central more elevated than the lateral wings, plastered and painted in white, with corners, cornices and frames in granite. The principal facade is slightly extended and elevated by several steps to a wooden entrance and exit doorways and their divisions, with lateral facades marked by single doors. The interior is occupied by access platform to the trams.

The upper stop includes lateral, sloping platforms paved in cobbles, with access to the rail line by a double staircase in granite, diverging at the top.
