= Carris =

Public transportation company in Portugal

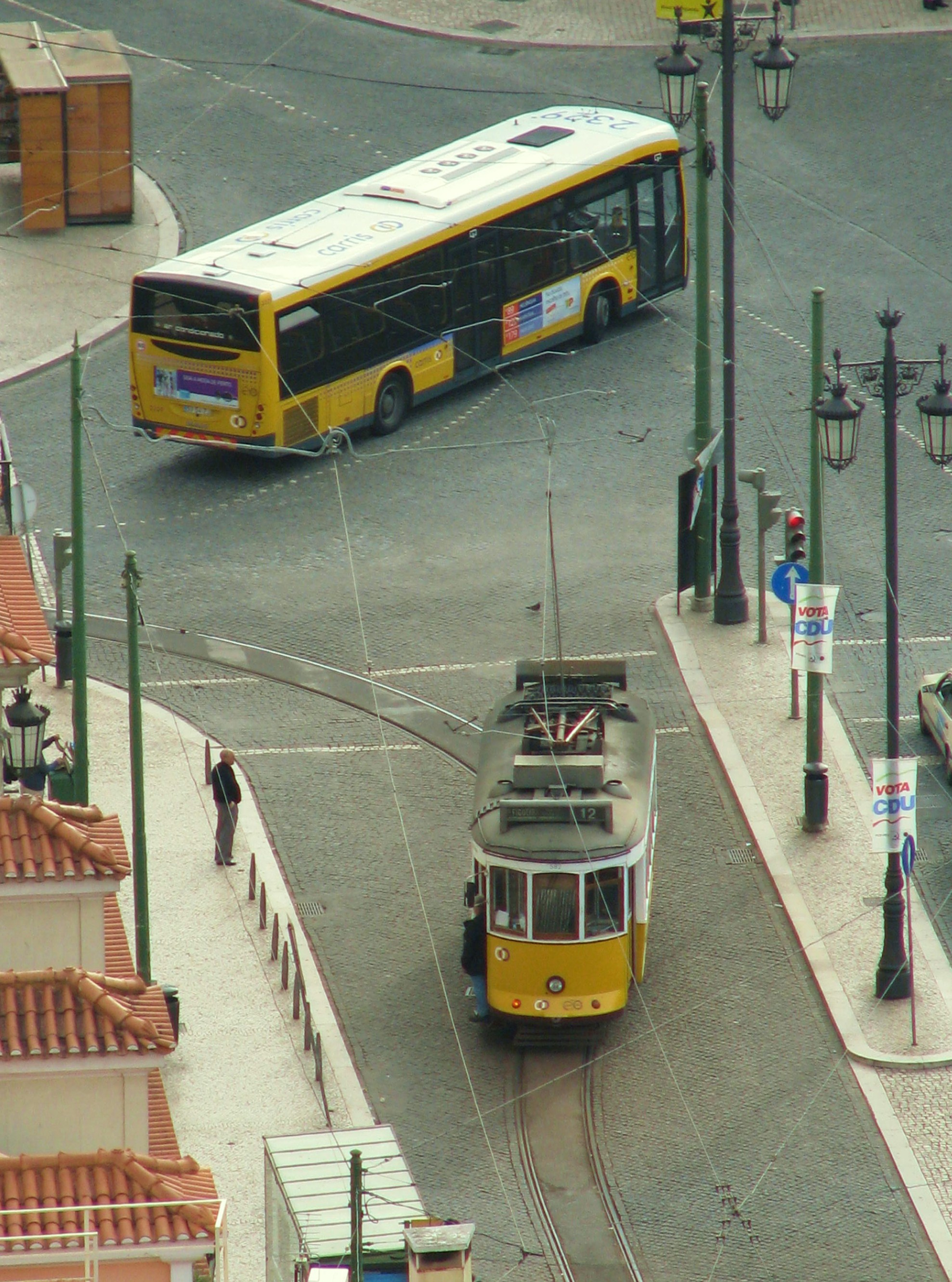
- Carris tram and bus in Lisbon

Overview
- Owner: Publicly owned
- Locale: Lisbon, Portugal
- Transit type: Bus, tram
- Chief executive: José Manuel Silva Rodrigues
- Headquarters: Linda-a-Velha, Oeiras Portugal
- Website: www.carris.pt

Operation
- Began operation: 18 September 1872
- Train length: 24 metres (79 ft)

Technical
- Track gauge: 900 mm (2 ft 11 7/16 in)
- Electrification: Overhead line 600 Volts DC
- Top speed: 70 km/h (43 mph)

Carris (Companhia Carris de Ferro de Lisboa) (Lisbon Tramways Company) is a public transportation company in Lisbon, Portugal. Carris operates Lisbon's buses, trams, and funiculars. It does not operate the Lisbon Metro. Carris was founded September 18, 1872. A total of 140.6 million passenger boardings were recorded in 2017.

As of September 20, 2021, Carris employed 2,588 individuals, with 1,285 bus drivers and 152 tram drivers. The company operated 724 buses, 48 trams, three funiculars (Elevador do Lavra, Elevador da Glória and Elevador da Bica), and an elevator (the Santa Justa lift). The last four were designed by the engineer Raoul Mesnier du Ponsard.

== See also ==
- Trams in Lisbon
