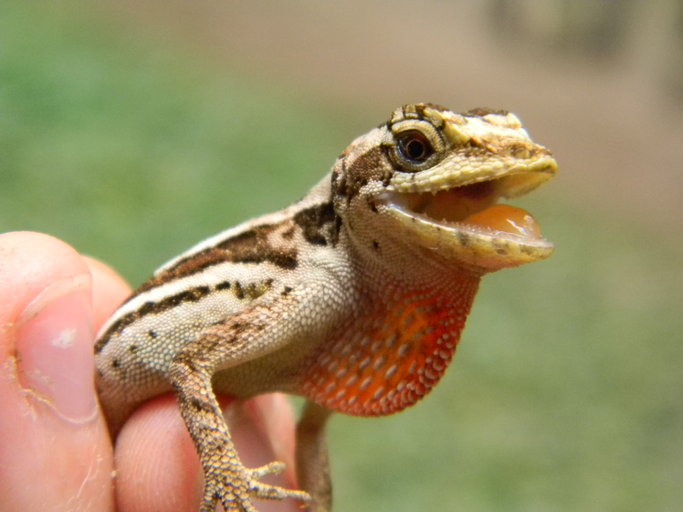

Conservation status
- Least Concern (IUCN 3.1)

Scientific classification
- Kingdom: Animalia
- Phylum: Chordata
- Class: Reptilia
- Order: Squamata
- Suborder: Iguania
- Family: Dactyloidae
- Genus: Anolis
- Species: A. lemurinus

Binomial name
- Anolis lemurinus Cope, 1861

= Anolis lemurinus =

Species of lizard

Anolis lemurinus, the ghost anole, is a species of lizard in the family Dactyloidae. The species is found in Mexico, Guatemala, Belize, El Salvador, Honduras, Nicaragua, Costa Rica, Panama, and Colombia.

== Description ==
In the A. lemurinus group, females exhibit polymorphic dewlap coloration, as opposed to the monomorphic male dewlaps. Female dewlap color varies regionally, possibly correlating with body size and showing greater similarity among nearby populations.
