= Banque Internationale pour la Centrafrique =

- Industry: Finance
- Headquarters: Bangui
- Products: Financial services

Banque Internationale pour la Centrafrique is a major bank of the Central African Republic.

The name of the bank is abbreviated to BICA.
