= Ascensor da Glória =

Funicular railway in Lisbon, Portugal

Glória Funicular Tram
- Ascensor da Glória
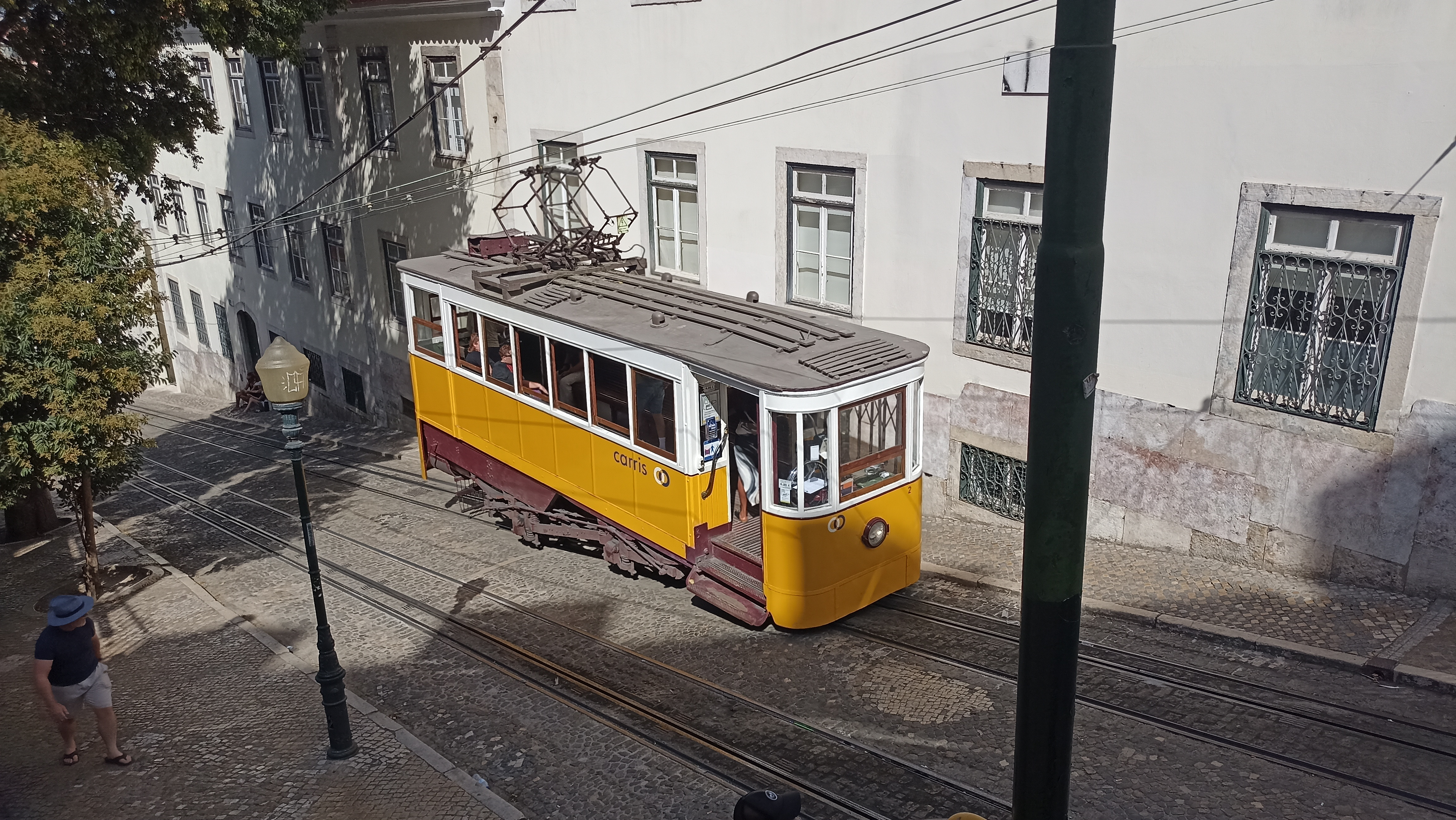
- A tram car on the upper section

Operation
- Locale: Calçada da Glória, Lisbon, Portugal
- Open: 24 October 1885
- Status: Suspended
- Owner: Portuguese Republic
- Operator: Carris
- Engineer: Raoul Mesnier du Ponsard

Infrastructure
- Type: Funicular
- Track gauge: 900 mm
- Propulsion system: Electric
- Electrification: Overhead, 600 V DC

Portuguese National Monument
- Type: Non-movable
- Criteria: National Monument
- Designated: 19 February 2002
- Reference no.: IPA.00003986

The Glória Funicular (Portuguese: Ascensor da Glória, popularly also known as Elevador da Glória) is a hybrid funicular-tram line in the civil parish of Santo António, in Lisbon, Portugal, operated by Carris. It connects the Pombaline downtown (at the Restauradores Square) with the Bairro Alto (São Pedro de Alcântara Garden). Along with the Elevador do Lavra and the Elevador da Bica it is one of three such funiculars in Lisbon.

It opened in 1885, and electric-powered services were introduced in 1915. Two new, identical, vehicles were constructed by German engineering company Maschinenfabrik Esslingen. Each can carry 42 people plus the conductor. The system was classified as a National Monument in 2002.

On 3 September 2025, one of the cars derailed and collided with a building, resulting in 16 deaths. The service was subsequently suspended. It is scheduled to reopen in 2029.

== Operation ==
The tram system is situated in an urban area, and extends from a lower station on Avenida da Liberdade to the second station at Rua de São Pedro de Alcântara, passing through a built-up area of 19th century buildings, including the Palácio Foz and Misericórdia. At its mid-way point, the line crosses over a tunnel for the railway tracks entering Rossio station.

The line slopes 17.7% (1 in 5.65), and conforms to the core principle of a true funicular, with two cars, numbered 1 & 2, permanently attached to opposite ends of a buried haulage cable, which is looped over a pulley at the upper end of the track. As one ascends the other descends, each acting as a counterweight to the other, the weight of the descending vehicle helping to pull the other one up. Unusually, though in common with the Ascensor do Lavra, traction is provided by electric motors on the vehicles, powered from a pair of trolleybus-style overhead wires at 600 V DC, through two pantographs in parallel.

The yellow and white vehicles have sloping steel chassis, to keep their interiors horizontal. They have steel bodies and glass windows, with a long wooden bench down each interior side.

They run on 900 mm tracks that are interleaved on the lower section. The 275-metre (902 ft) journey takes approximately three minutes.

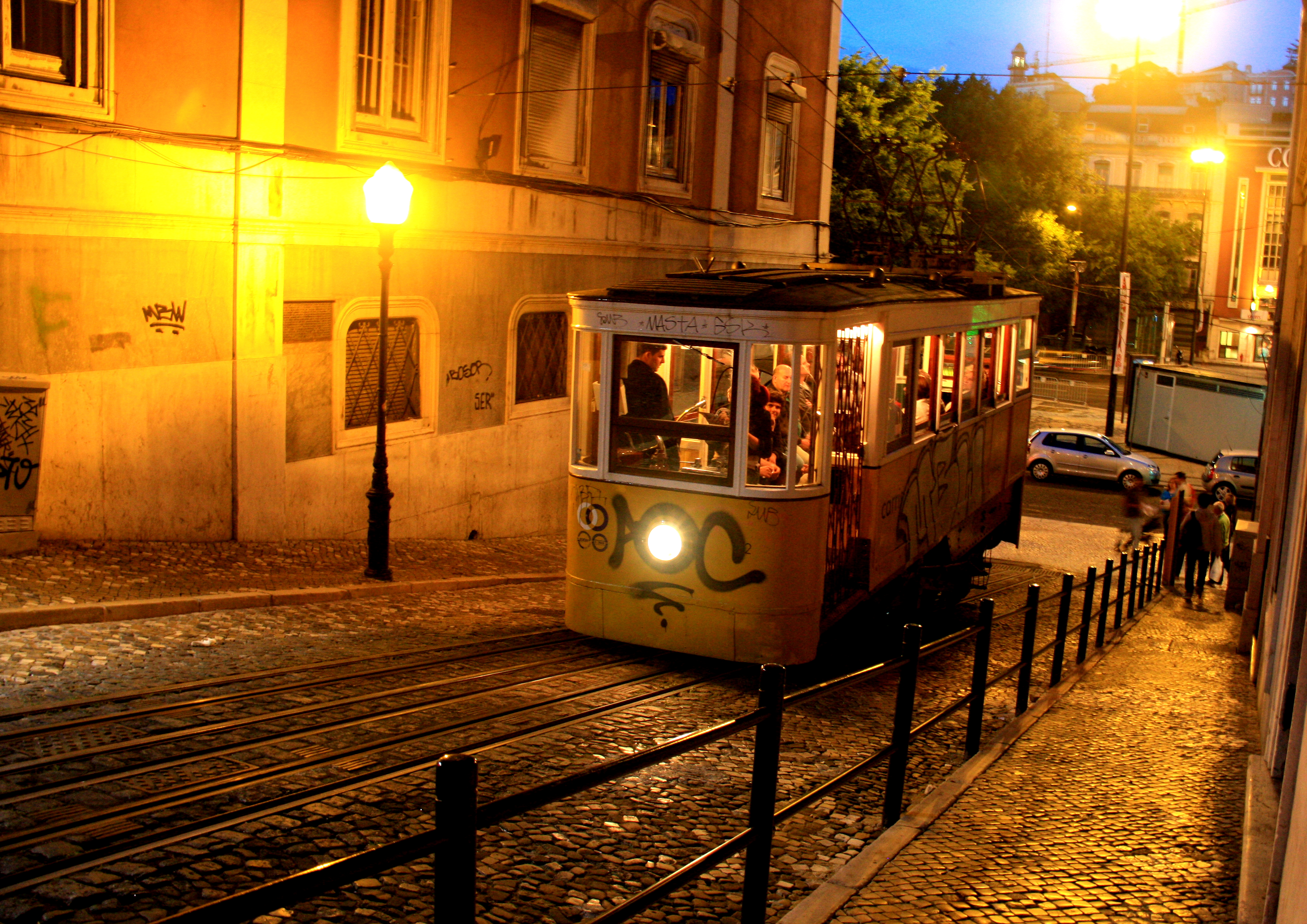
Night-time view of a graffitied tram, on one of the lower section's interleaved tracks

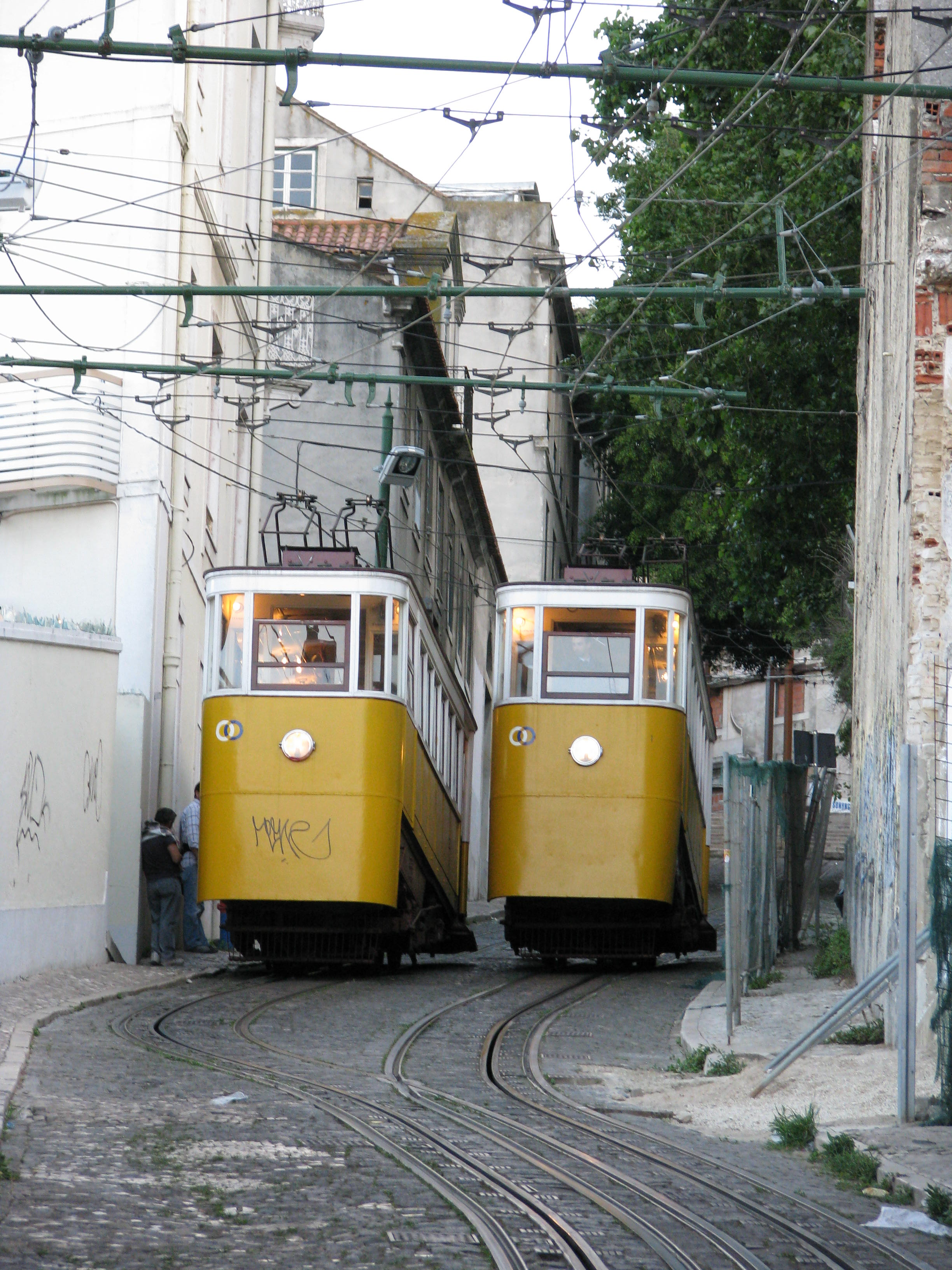
The interleaved tracks separate just below the passing point

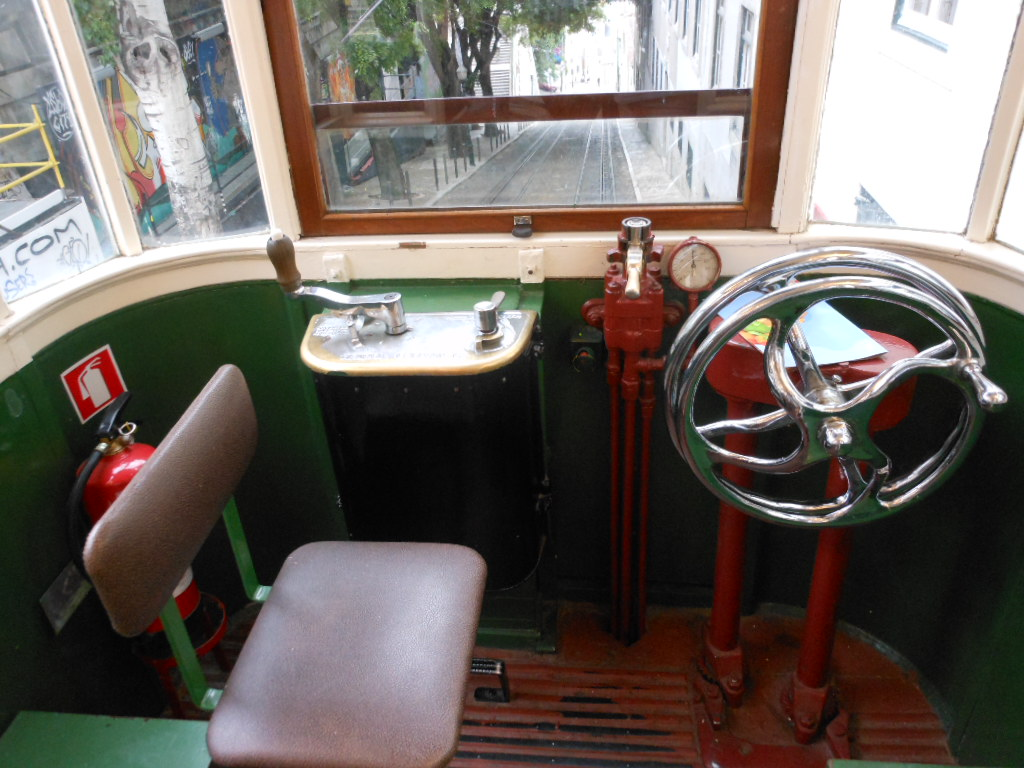
Brakeman's position

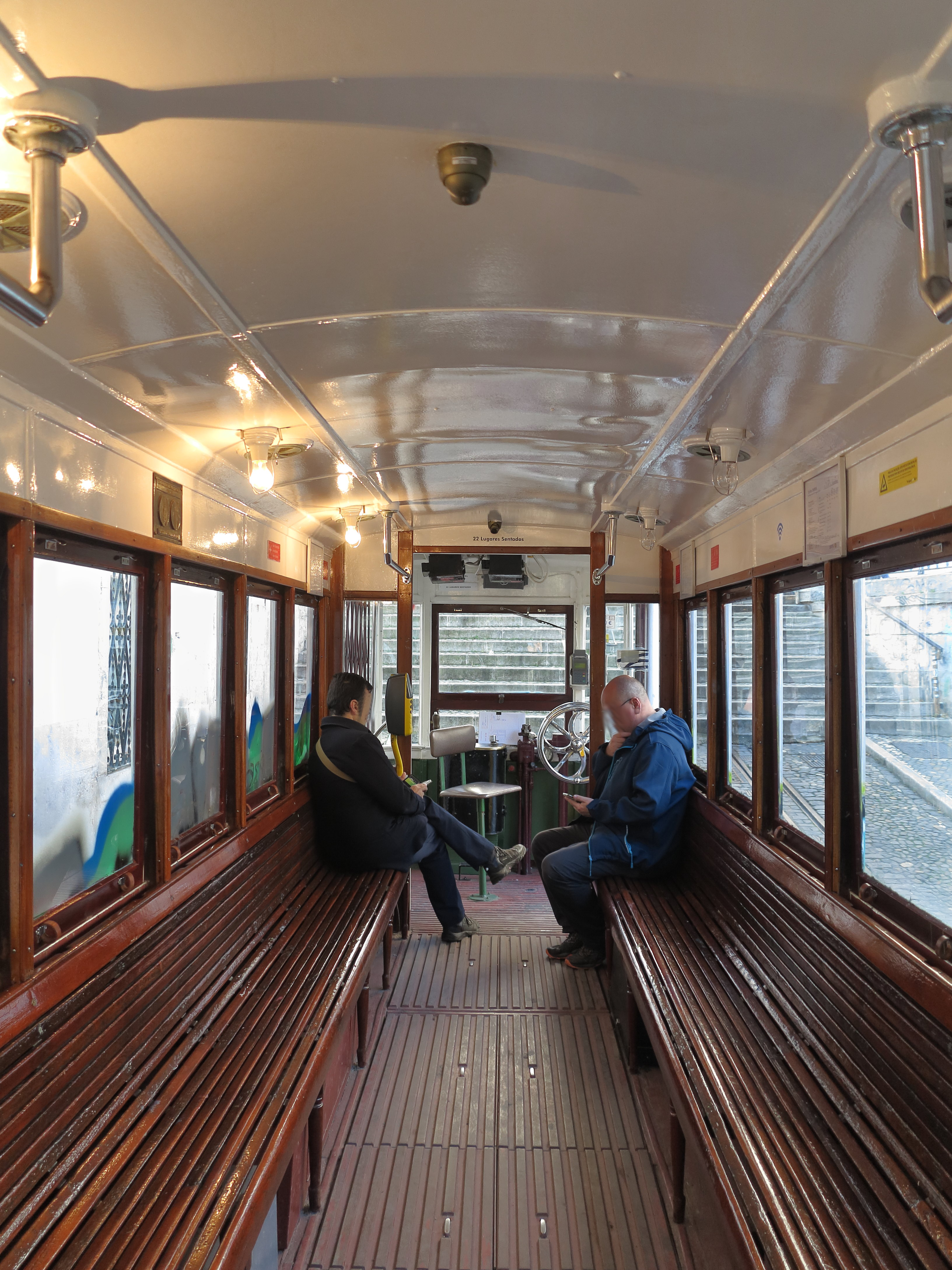
Interior of a car, showing the horizontal floor level with longitudinal seats

== History ==
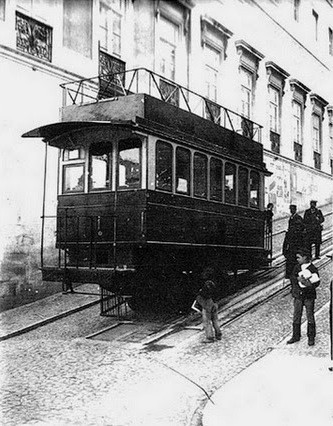
One of the tram cars as seen at the beginning of the 20th century

In 1875, a concession was granted to Nova Companhia dos Ascensores Mecânicos de Lisboa (NCAML) to construct a tram along the Calçada da Glória. The concession's chief engineer was Raoul Mesnier du Ponsard. Construction began in 1882.

The completed lift was inaugurated on 24 October 1885. There were two cars, each of which was divided into two floors, with two benches on the lower interior floor facing inwards and two on the upper exterior floor back-to-back.

The funicular was initially powered by a water balance system, but only for one year until in 1886 it was replaced by a system having the cable wound around a steam-powered pulley in a powerhouse located on a side street off of Calçada da Glória. The cable lifted and lowered the cars from the top of the trackway.

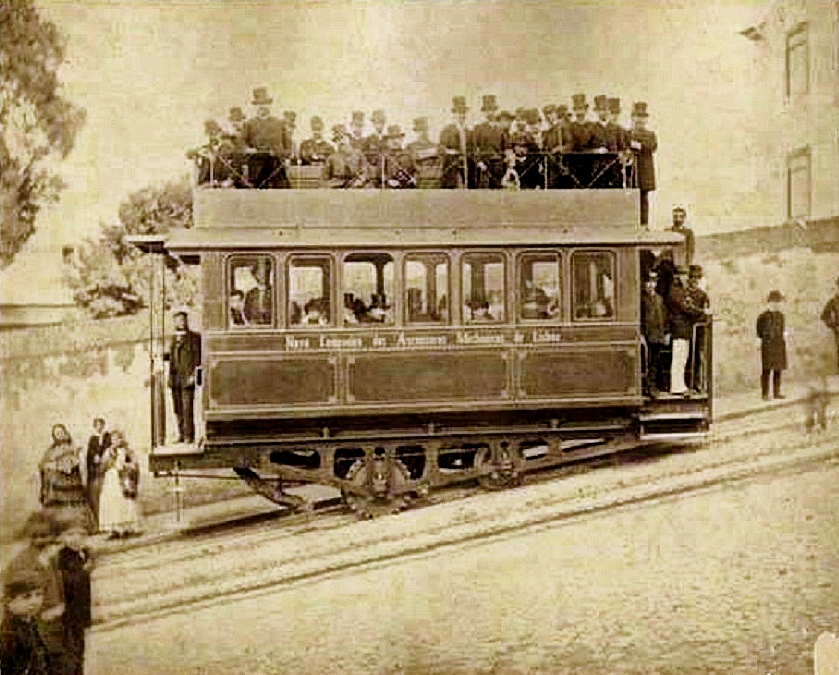
Inaugural run of Glória funicular showing braking pinion.

During the water- and steam-powered period, the funicular ran on a Riggenbach-type rack rail system for braking safety. Car designs and photos show one lateral rack rail and a pair of standard rails used in combination for the track. One or both of the axles on each car had a pinion fixed to one side of the wheel and brake shoes on discs between the wheels. The pinion slotted into the rack to prevent wheel slippage. Tests by Mesnier du Ponsard and the city government's engineers in 1885 showed that the system was sufficient to control cars without the support of the cable.

In 1912, NCAML signed a contract with the Municipal Council of Lisbon that allowed them to electrify the lines. These repairs and installations occurred between 1914 and 1915, before returning to operation. The rack and pinion system was removed at this time.

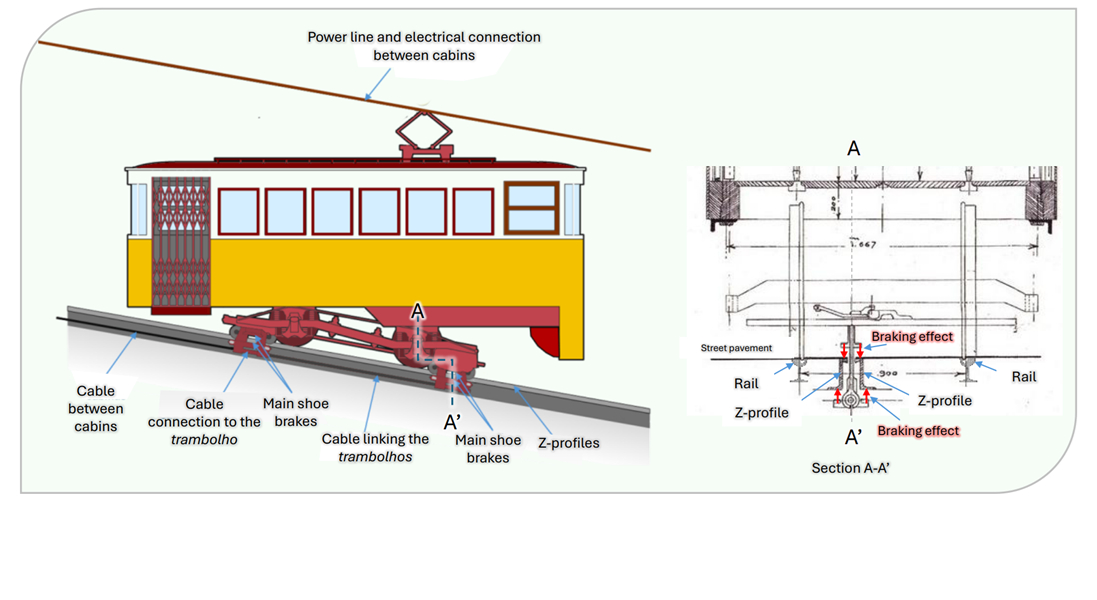
Diagram of the main brake used on both cars. The brake pads are gripping the Z-profile in the ground.

From this time onward, electric motors power each axle. The now-passive funicular cable counterbalances the load between the cars and the motors only require sufficient force to raise and lower the cars through wheel friction on the rails. Braking is done by a vertical vise pneumatically pressing on the top and bottom of the metal channel carrying the underground cable between the rails. There is also an auxiliary manual brake that presses a shoe against each wheel.

In 1926, NCAML was dissolved and the funicular became a property of the Companhia Carris. As part of the change, in 1927, a shelter was inaugurated for passengers, which was constructed along the Praça dos Restauradores, which was contested. It was demolished in 1934.

On 1 August 1995, Carris presented a proposal to classify the line as a heritage site, to which the IPPAR (Note: Instituto Português do Património Arquitetónico, former institute now part of Direção-Geral do Património Cultural.) consultative council proposed the classification of the tram as a National Monument on 11 March 1997. A dispatch on 9 April 1997 recommended the approval by the Minister of Culture and monument status was conferred in 2002. The DRLisboa (Note: Direção Regional de Lisboa, IPPAR’s Lisbon regional directorate.) proposed the expansion of the classification to the former steam powerhouse building on Travessa do Fala-Só and rectification of the law, which was approved on 7 January 2003 by IPPAR.

=== Derailments ===
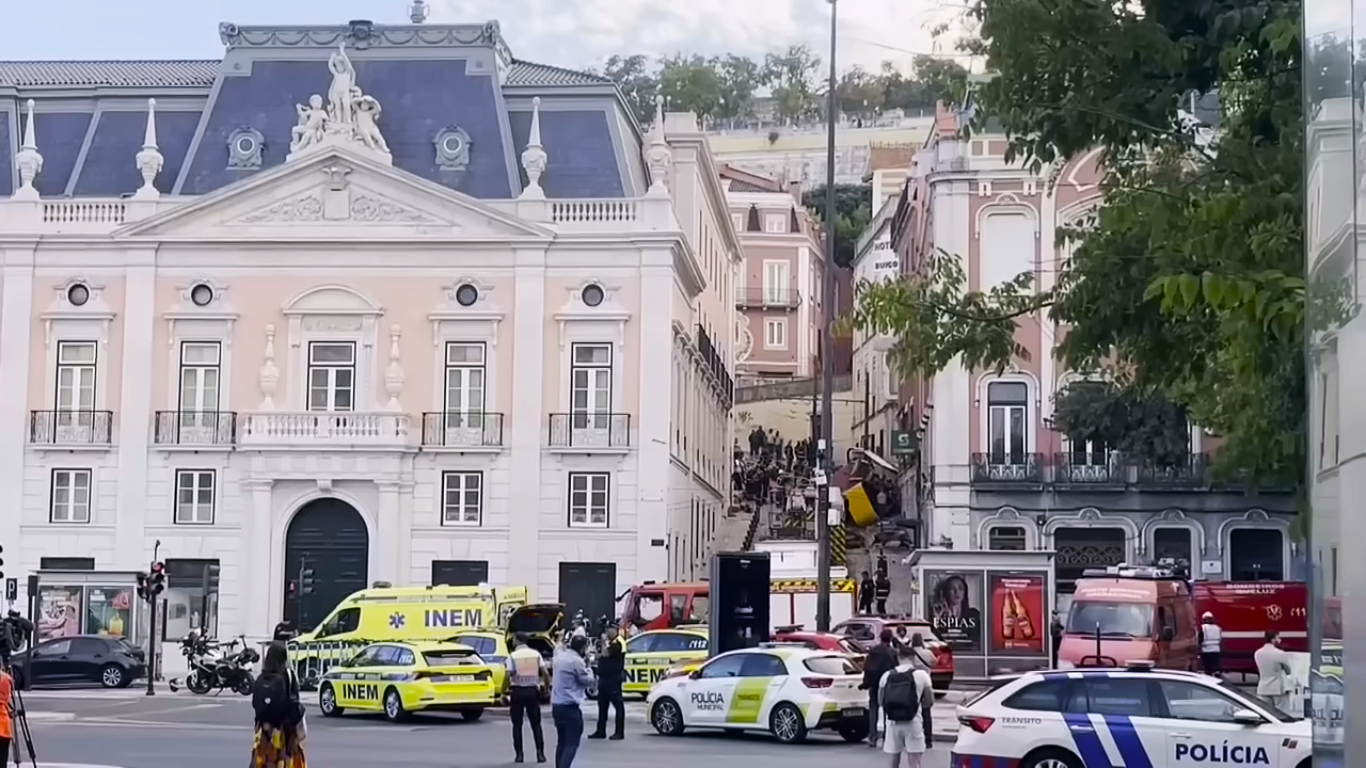
Aftermath of the collision following the 2025 derailment

The Ascensor da Glória has experienced occasional derailments, including two major incidents in the 21st century.

On 7 May 2018, a car derailed due to insufficient wheel maintenance. No injuries were reported.

On 3 September 2025, a car ran away and then derailed before hitting a building during the evening rush hour, killing 16 people, including the brakeman, and injuring 21. People of multiple nationalities were among those killed and injured.

== See also ==
- Ascensor da Bica
- Ascensor do Lavra
- List of funicular railways
