= BICA Honduras =

Non-profit environmental organization in Honduras

Bay Islands Conservation Association
Elevation:	74 m (243 ft)
Coordinates:	16.10°N 86.90°W
Location:	Bay Islands, Honduras

The Bay Islands Conservation Association (BICA) is a non-profit, non-governmental organization founded in 1991 in the Bay Islands in Honduras in order to initiate and coordinate efforts in protecting the fragile natural resources of its three islands. BICA's operation and projects are funded through the support of local individuals, businesses and national and international agencies. BICA has three chapters, located in Roatan, Utila, and Guanaja.

== History ==
In 1987 and 1989, the forests in Roatan were ablaze from out of control burning. Many fires were set, scars of which are still on the island. It was part of the practice of slash and burn agriculture, in which the land is set on fire to clear it for cattle grazing. There was a mistaken belief that cleared land was more valuable. Around that time, there was a growing awareness that the reef was deteriorating due to sedimentation from the land and overfishing and physical anchor damage

BICA opened its first office in Coxen Hole in 1991. It immediately began community outreach and education on the importance and fragility of our island's ecosystem.

In 1995, BICA agreed to manage the Sandy Bay-West End Marine Reserve, which it still manages.

== Taxa named in honor of BICA ==
A species of lizard, Anolis bicaorum, which is endemic to the Bay Islands, is named in honor of BICA.
