= Ascensor do Lavra =

Funicular railway in Lisbon, Portugal

Lavra Funicular
- Ascensor do Lavra
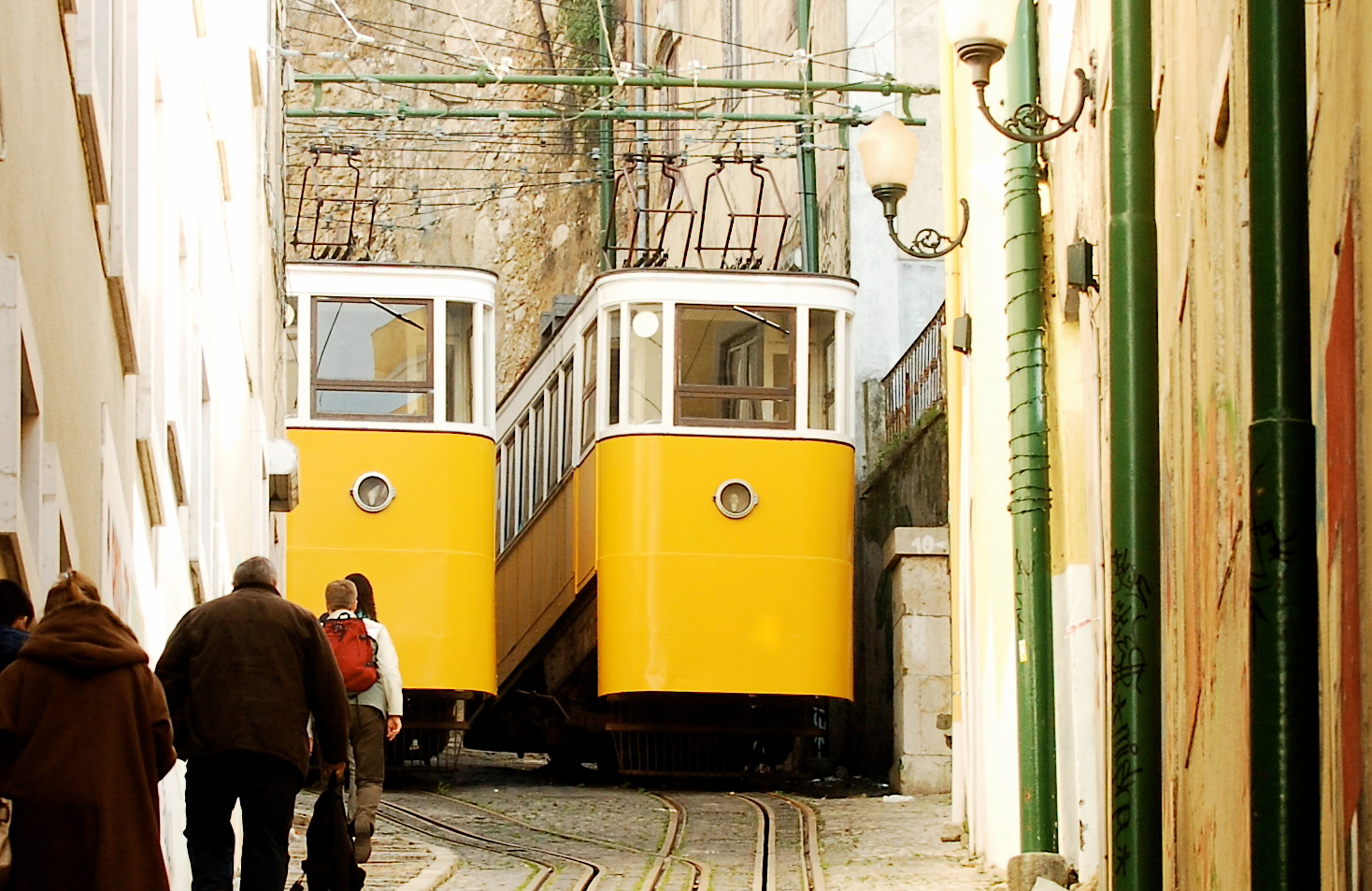

Operation
- Locale: Lisbon, Portugal
- Open: 19 April 1884
- Status: Suspended for inspection
- Operator: Carris
- Engineer: Raoul Mesnier du Ponsard

Infrastructure
- Type: Funicular
- Track gauge: 900 mm (2 ft 11 7/16 in)
- Electrification: Overhead, 600 V DC

Statistics
- Route length: 188 m (617 ft)
- Stops: 2

Portuguese National Monument
- Type: Non-movable
- Criteria: National Monument
- Designated: 19 February 2002
- Reference no.: IPA.00003040

The Ascensor do Lavra, also known as the Elevador do Lavra or Lavra Funicular, is a funicular railway in Lisbon, Portugal. Opened in 1884, the railway is the oldest funicular in the city, having been in operation almost continuously for 141 years.

The 188m-long funicular connects Largo da Anunciada to Rua Câmara Pestana in the parishes of Santo António and Arroios. The average grade is 22.9 % and the railway gauge is 900 mm with a central slot for the cable's connection. The two vehicles were constructed by German engineering company Maschinenfabrik Esslingen. They have a similar design to the Ascensor da Glória with a steel base carriage with wheels, a wood interior with 2 long wood benches along steel walls with glass windows, all painted in exterior with yellow and white colors. The tracks are interleaved on the lower section. The vehicles only move at the same time: as one ascends the other descends, each car acting as a counterweight to the other, the weight of the descending car helping to pull the other one up.

The Ascensor do Lavra was designed by engineer Raoul Mesnier du Ponsard and opened on April 19, 1884. Like the Ascensor Glória, Lavra was originally a water-balance funicular. After a year of operation, it was converted to steam power, with a powerhouse at the top of Calçada do Lavra. In 1915 the operation was electrified.

Currently, the funicular is owned and operated by Carris. Ascensor do Lavra was designated a National Monument in 2002.

== See also ==
- Ascensor da Bica
- Ascensor da Glória
