= Raoul Mesnier du Ponsard =

Portuguese engineer (1848–1914)

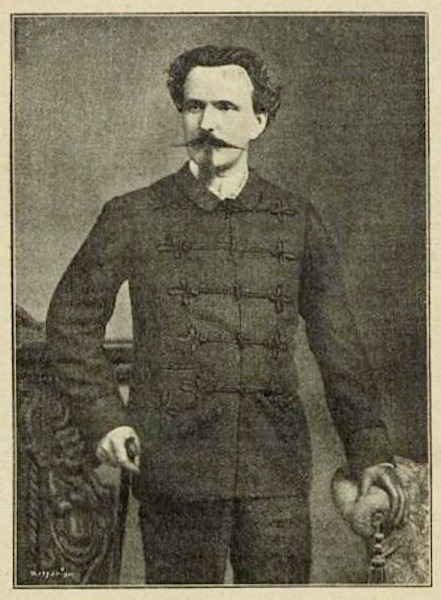
Raoul Ronson Mesnier de Ponsard (1848–1914)

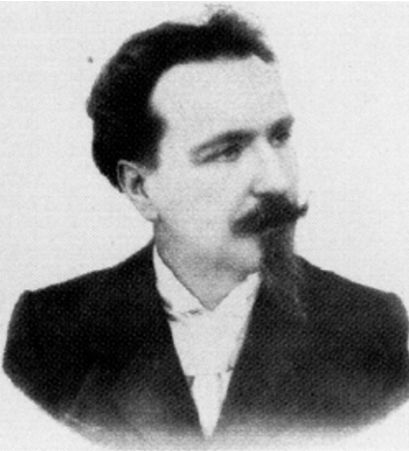
Raoul Ronson Mesnier du Ponsard

Raoul Mesnier du Ponsard (São Nicolau, Porto, 2 April 1848 — Inhambane, Mozambique 26 May 1914) was a Portuguese engineer of French parentage, known for building many elevators and funiculars in Portugal. He is particularly known for his engineering work on Lisbon landmarks the Santa Justa Lift, the Ascensor da Glória, the Ascensor da Bica, and the Ascensor do Lavra, as well as the Bom Jesus do Monte Funicular in Braga.

== Early life ==
Mesnier was the son of French parents Jacques Robert Mesnier de Ponsard and Marie Élodie Ronson; his father worked in Braga at its gas company. He had an older brother, Pedro Gastão, born in 1846, who became a diplomatic aide.

He studied at the Liceu do Porto and later mathematics and philosophy at the University of Coimbra. Following his degree, he apprenticed in mechanical engineering at shops in France, Germany and Switzerland. Returning to Portugal, in 1871 he married Sofia Adelaide Ferreira Pinto Basto in Porto on 3 September.

== Engineering work ==
As an engineer on various public works, Mesnier directed the construction of the Bom Jesus do Monte Funicular in Braga (the oldest in the Iberian Peninsula) and designed the original Guindais funicular in Porto. Following the success of the Bom Jesus Funicular, he became involved with various transport projects in Lisbon that still operate: the Ascensor do Lavra, the Ascensor da Glória, the Ascensor da Bica and the Santa Justa Lift. Outside of Lisbon, Mesnier built the Nazaré Funicular, and the defunct Comboio do Monte, in Funchal. Other of his works were decommissioned in later years: the lifts at Biblioteca and Chiado, and the cable-cars serving Graça, Estrela, and São Sebastião.

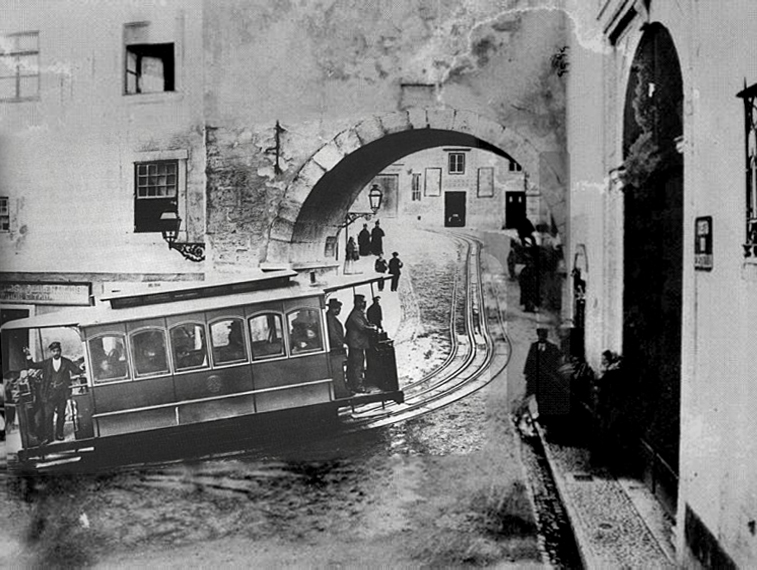
Graça cable car approaching Arco de Santo Andrė

Mesnier contributed engineering designs for three Lisbon cable-car lines: Graça, Estrela, and São Sebastião. Worldwide, only four cable-car services were ever built outside of Anglophone countries (Great Britain, Australia, New Zealand, USA). Unlike the San Francisco cable-car lines, Lisbon's did not run on generally wide and straight streets. This required innovative solutions for the engineering problems posed by the geometry. To thread the Arco de Santo Andrė and its hairpin turn up the Calçada da Graça, Mesnier designed a double grip system on the cars to engage a low-tension cable through the turn. One was used to travel through the turns and the other on the rest of the route.

In 1913, Mesnier made an engineering study for a railway in Mozambique linking Inhambane with Inharrime. Work on the railway took place between 1909 and 1915, and railway personnel were reported to be on-site in January 1908. Mesnier may have been at work there at the time of his death.

== Other projects ==
Mesnier published designs for other inventions, notable amongst which are a revolver (1879), a modified carbine breech loading mechanism (1879), a repeating rifle (1879 & 1880), and a mechanical calculating machine called the Aritmotecno (1882).

In 1903, a syndicate that included Mesnier petitioned for a concession to build an aerial cableway system in São Tomé e Principe to transport goods over its steep terrain and to provide mechanical power to remote locations where needed for industrial work, e.g. logging activity. Mesnier laid out the general advantages for such systems in the article. However, there is no evidence in S. Tomé of its ever being built.

Also in 1903, Mesnier made a bid to the minister of the Navy for a concession to operate an electrically powered system for ship cargo and train loading and unloading at the port of Lourenco Marques (Maputo), Mozambique. Included in the project were new jetties to handle deep-draft ships. Pending successful patent awards for the equipment, he hoped to form a company and find investors to build and operate the facility.

== Legacy ==
During his lifetime, Mesnier was acknowledged for his engineering accomplishments in Lisbon. On two separate occasions, transport companies affiliated with him asked him for public announcements of support for their work. At the time of his death, he was memorialized by an engineering trade journal for his work on the Santa Justa Lift, particularly.

Rua Raúl Mesnier du Ponsard, in the Lumiar neighborhood of Lisbon, is named after him.

In 2002, Portugal declared four of his engineering works in Lisbon to be national monuments: the Santa Justa Lift, the Ascensor da Glória, the Ascensor da Bica, and the Ascensor do Lavra. Outside of Lisbon, the Elevador do Bom Jesus is also a national monument. The Nazaré Funicular is still operating, though not a national monument.
