= Fazenda da Bica =

Region of Rio de Janeiro, Brazil

Coordinates: 22°53′27″S 43°19′55″W

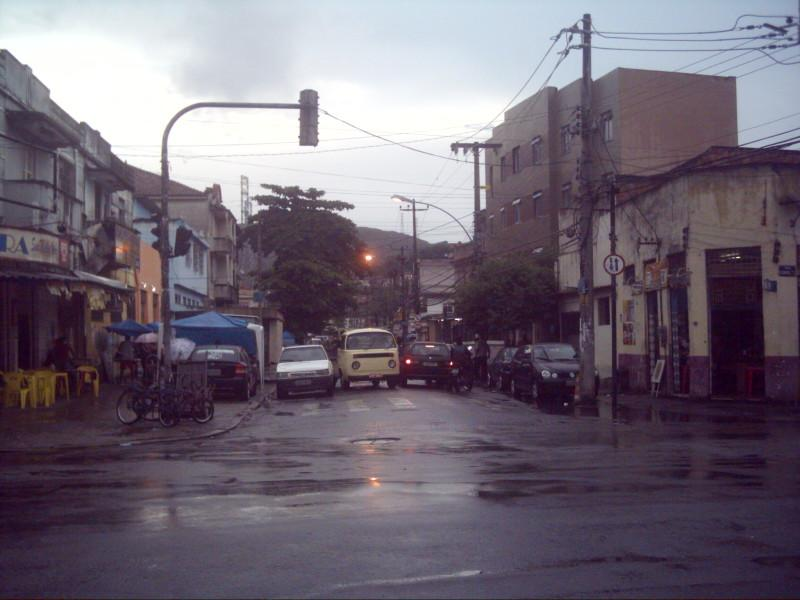
Street of Fazenda da Bica in Rio de Janeiro

Fazenda da Bica is a region of Rio de Janeiro, but not officially recognized as a neighborhood.
