= Ascensor da Bica =

Funicular railway in Lisbon, Portugal

Bica Funicular
- Ascensor da Bica
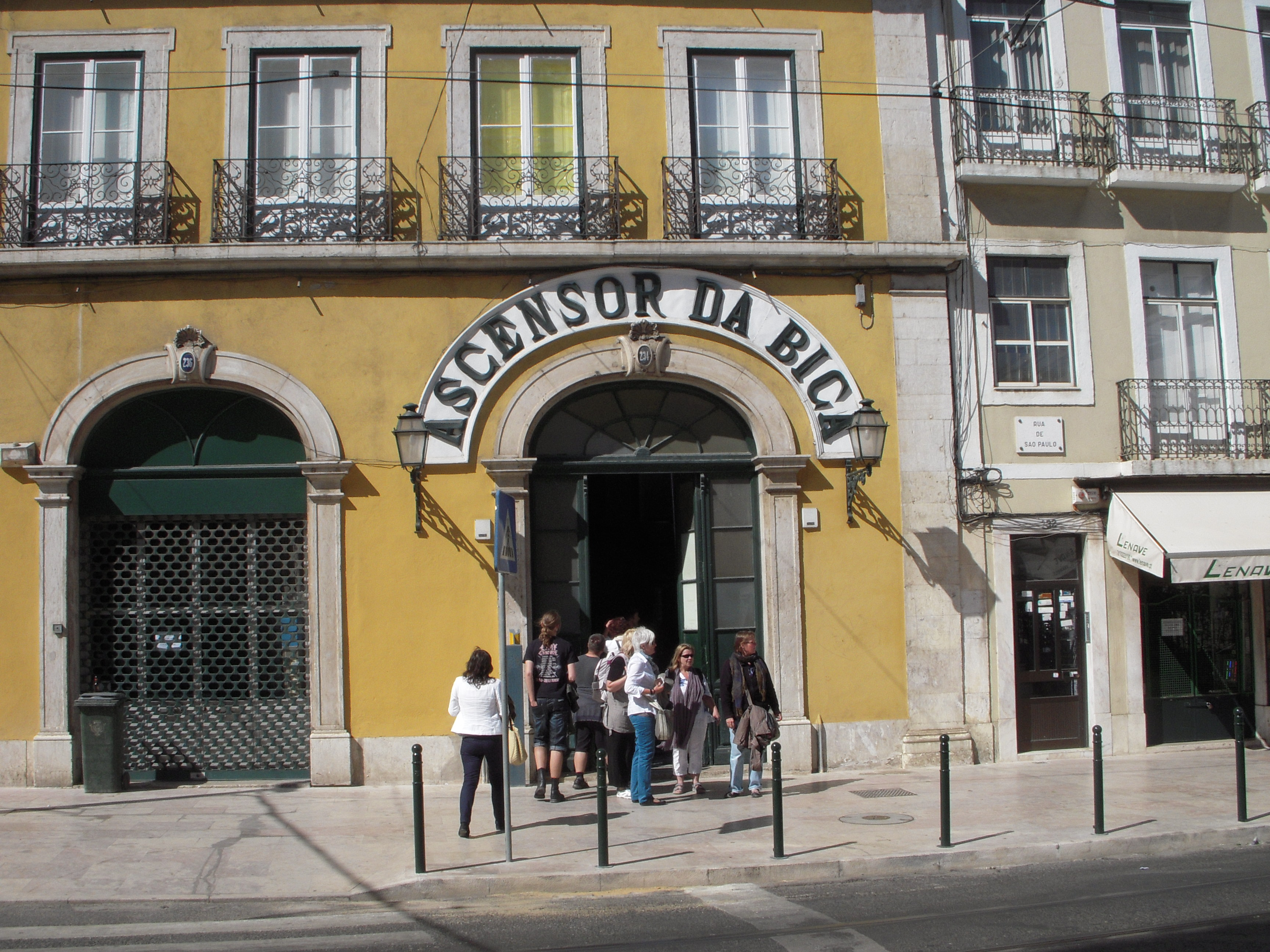
- A view of the lower funicular station along Rua de São Paulo
- Interactive map of the Bica Funicular area

General information
- Status: Suspended for inspection
- Type: Funicular
- Location: Lisbon, Portugal
- Coordinates: 38°42′31″N 9°8′49″W
- Opened: 1892
- Owner: Portuguese Republic
- Management: Carris

Technical details
- Material: Mixed masonry

Design and construction
- Architect: Raoul Mesnier du Ponsard

Website
- www.carris.pt/en/travel/carreiras/bica-funicular/

Portuguese National Monument
- Type: Non-movable
- Criteria: National Monument
- Designated: 19 February 2002
- Reference no.: IPA.00006465

The Bica Funicular (Portuguese: Ascensor da Bica), sometimes known as the Elevador da Bica (Bica Lift), is a funicular railway line in the civil parish of Misericórdia, in the municipality of Lisbon, Portugal. Operated by Carris, it connects the Rua de São Paulo with Calçada do Combro/Largo do Calhariz/Rua do Loreto. It has been in operation almost continuously for 134 years.

The line conforms to the funicular principle, with two cars permanently attached to opposite ends of a haulage cable, which is looped over a pulley at the upper end of the track. The cable links the two cars together so that they ascend and descend simultaneously, each car acting as a counterweight for the other one.

== History ==
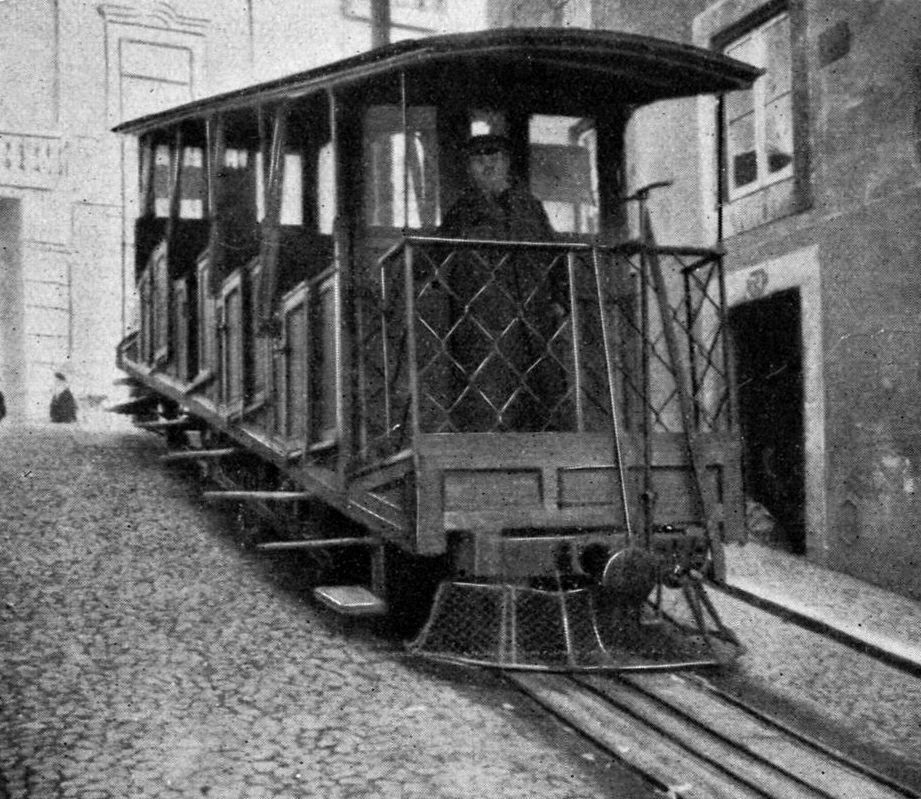
A view of the funicular car at the top stop (in 1909)

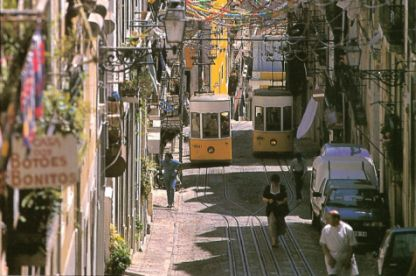
A view of the incline between Rua da Bica de Duarte Belo and Rua de São Paulo

In 1888, the municipality of Lisbon signed a contract with the Nova Companhia dos Ascensores de Lisboa (NCAML) providing them a concession to install and operate a lift system that connected the Rua da Bica de Duarte Belo to the Rua de São Paulo along the Largo do Calhariz. The project was conceived by Raoul Mesnier du Ponsard. The mechanical motor of the elevator was installed in 1890, after the conclusion of the track work. However, the lift only began functioning on 28 June 1892, after a couple of years of tests. The funicular was originally powered by steam.

In 1912, NCAML signed a new contract with the municipality, allowing it to expand the electrification of all the lines. Between 1914 and 1916, the project to automate the transport system using electrical systems was completed. During tests there was an accident where one of the cars became uncontrollable and crashed into the Rua de São Paulo lower station, resulting in its complete destruction. As a result, the funicular became inoperable for the next few years. After the dissolution of NCAML the lift became the property of Companhia Carris (or, simply, Carris).

In 1923, the municipal council demanded that company return the Bica lift to operation, forcing it to work on the line and install new cars, provided by the firm of Theodore Bell. In 1927, the funicular returned to operation, now under electrical power.

On 29 September 2005, it was proposed that the funicular be included in the Special Protection Zone by the DRCLVTejo. In 2009 the dispatch was approved by the Minister of Culture, and on 20 May 2011, the declaration was ratified that classified the lift with the architectural protection zone (Diário da República, 874/2011, Série-2, 98).

== Architecture ==
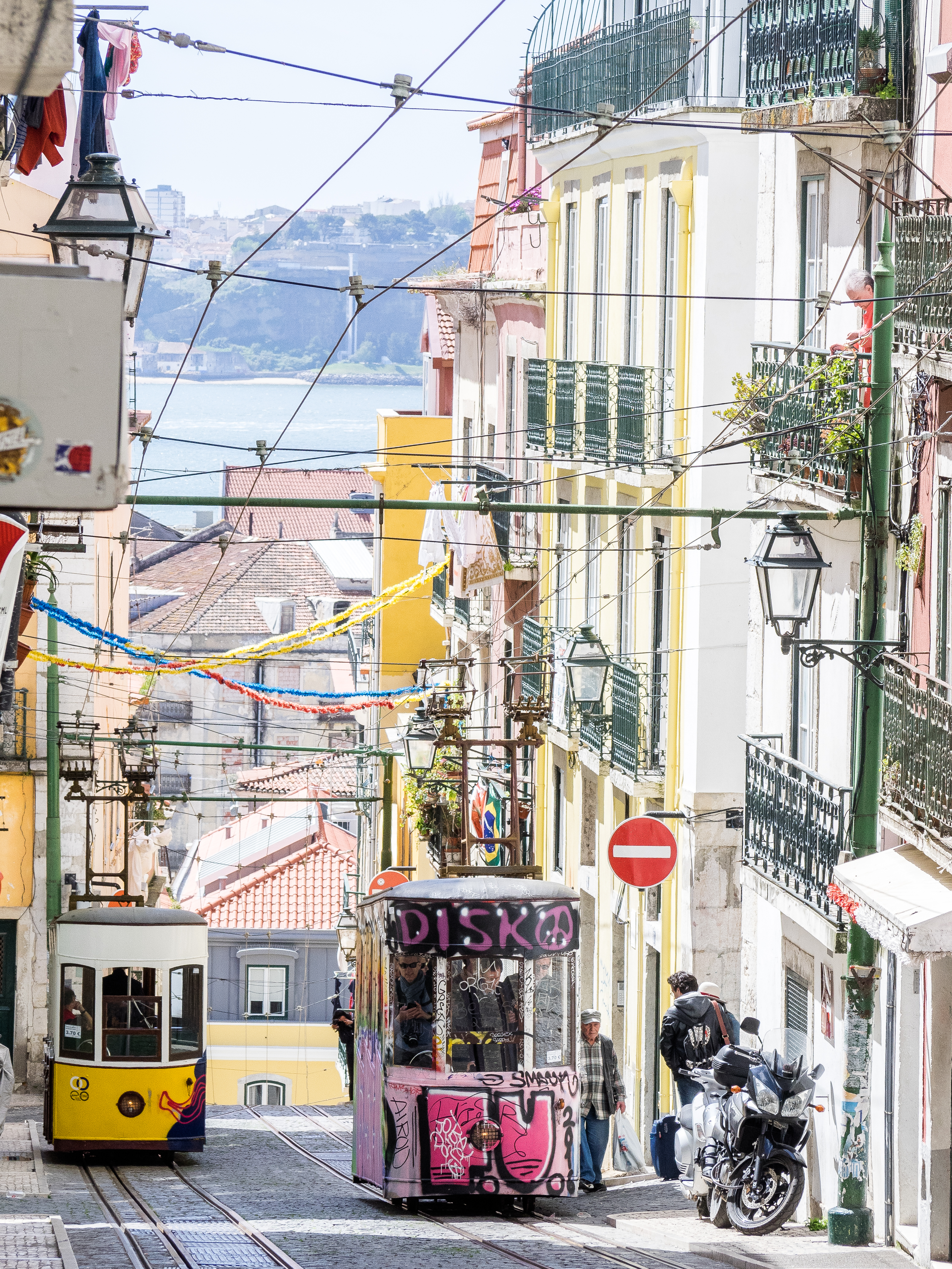
Ascending and descending cars on the road

The funicular system is situated on the edge of the Pombaline downtown area of Lisbon overlooking the Tagus River, implanted along an axis dominated by an accentuated slope. Its course follows an area of predominantly rental buildings constructed during the 18th century, .

The lift includes two cars that travel the distance simultaneously in opposite directions. The cars have three doors on either side (with two flanked windows per door), and three compartments within the platform, with wooden seats oriented transversely from the central body.

The funicular/lift rises along an 11.8% incline to the Rua da Bica de Duarte Belo, a distance of 245 metres (804 ft), from the Rua de São Paulo. The transit system includes the Rua da Bica, Largo de Santo Antoninho and Travessa da Bica Grande. The lower station is almost hidden behind a façade on the Rua de S. Paulo with the inscription Ascensor da Bica.

The façade is framed in stonework, with gates of wrought iron and portico with arch. The upper floors include rectangular windows, with the first and second floors including wrought iron varandas and the third floor with smaller picture windows. At the top a decorative cornice divides the upper floor from the Mansard roof, with wrought iron railing. In the interior, is a small atrium with circulation corridor for the cars; with tile wainscoting, plastered walls and azulejo tile the main platform is delimited by wrought iron gate and lateral staircases.

== See also ==
- Ascensor da Glória
- Ascensor do Lavra
- List of funicular railways
