= Water balance railway =

Type of highly inclined railway

A water balance railway is a funicular, aerial tramway, or cable railway that uses the weight of water to move its carriages.

== History ==
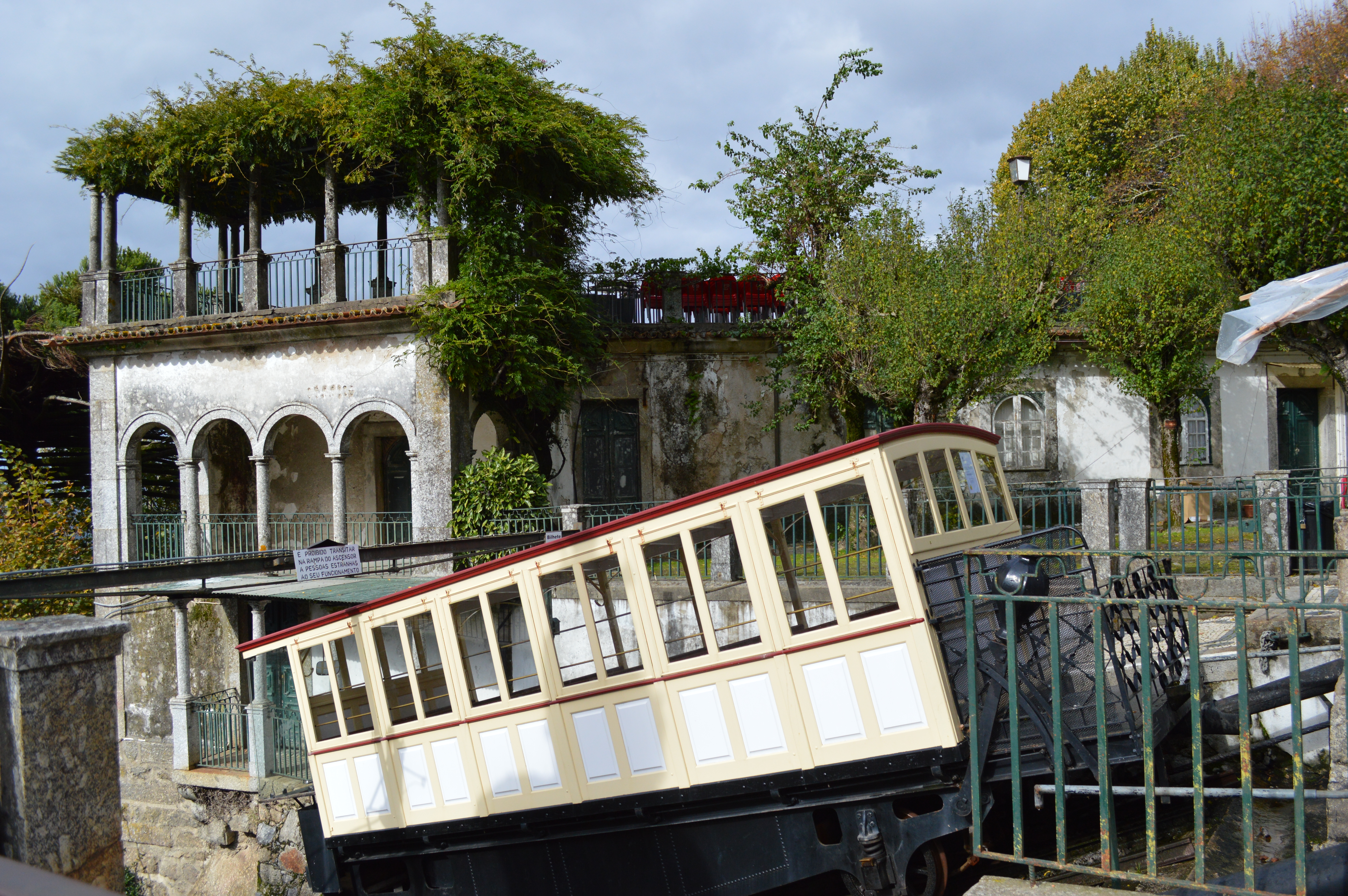
The oldest operating water balance in the world, the Elevador do Bom Jesus in Braga (Portugal)

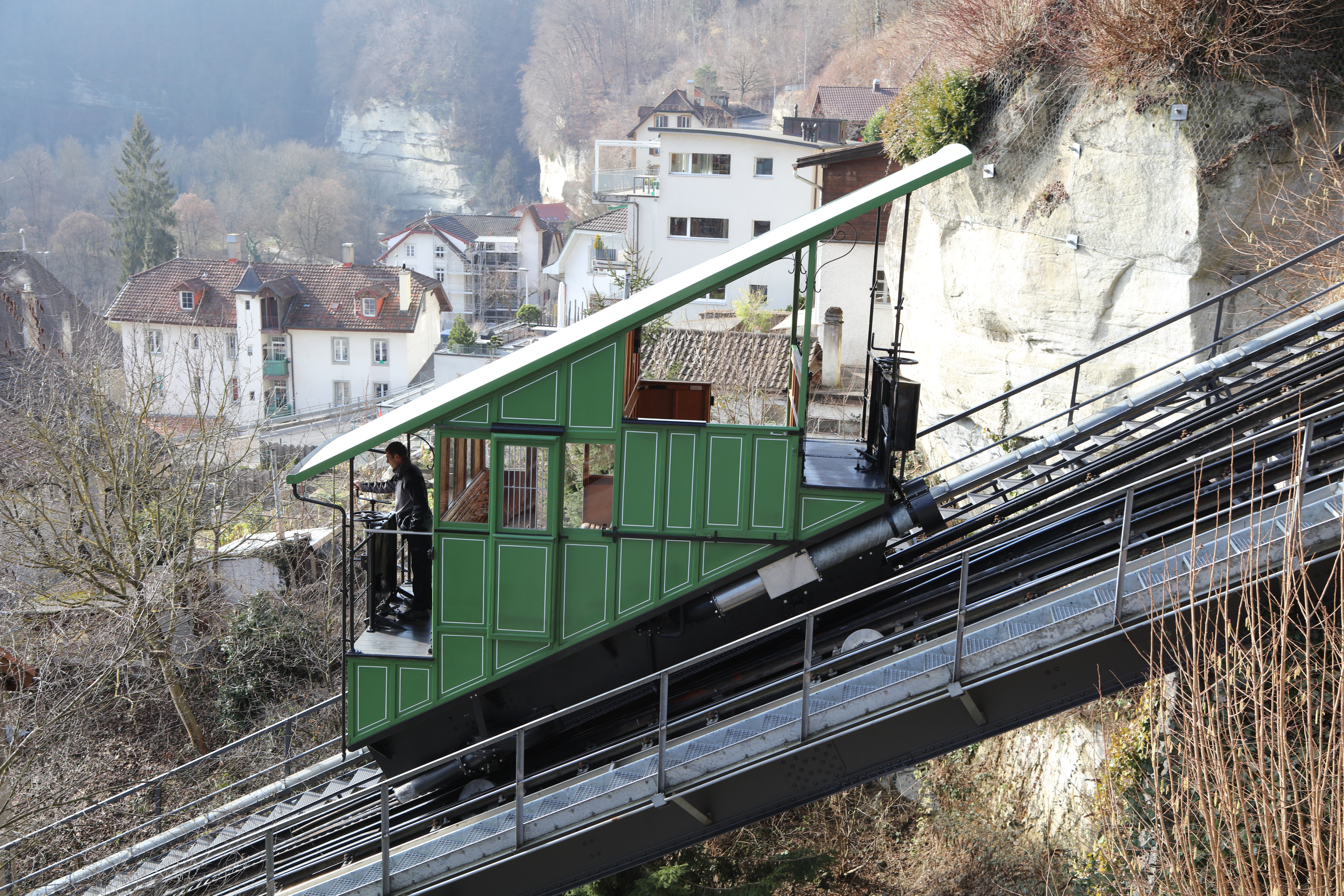
The Fribourg funicular, the last water balance railway still operating in Switzerland

The first water balance railway was probably the Prospect Park Incline Railway, opened in 1845 on the American side of Niagara Falls. It was later converted to electric operation and was shut down after an accident in 1908.

The oldest water balance railway in Europe is the Giessbachbahn in Brienz, Switzerland, which opened in 1879 and was electrified in 1948. The Bom Jesus do Monte Funicular in Braga, Portugal, opened in 1882, and is the oldest railway that is still operating as a water balance.

In Germany, the last operating water balance railway is the Nerobergbahn in Wiesbaden. In Switzerland, there is only one train left, the Funicular Neuveville–Saint-Pierre in Fribourg.

== Operation ==
Abt switch

The railway‘s two carriages are connected by a rope or cable that runs over a pulley in the upper station. The carriages maintain approximate balance, so propelling the wagon requires only applying the force to unbalance the system. This is done by artificially increasing the mass of the car standing in the upper station with water, allowing the gravity acting on this additional mass to move the train.

Both cars, therefore, have a ballast water tank. Between two journeys, water is filled into the tank of the carriage in the upper station, while the tank of the carriage in the lower station is emptied. The upper, heavier vehicle driving down the hill now pulls the lower, lighter one up the incline. The amount of water required depends on the weight difference between the two cars, which is assumed to be around 80 litres for each passenger. Because the length of the rope and thus the weight of the rope between the sheave and the wagon going down the hill increases steadily while the rope is moving up-hill, the speed must be regulated while driving. This is done with brakes in the vehicles, which usually act on a rack in the track bed, and especially in longer systems, also by draining water from the wagon going down the hill. Some lifts, including Lynton and Lynmouth Cliff Railway, have a lower rope to compensate for the weight of the rope, which is also guided over a pulley in the lower station.

The water required for railway operations was usually taken from a nearby body of water near the upper station. In areas where water from the local region was unavailable at the upper station, it was pumped from the valley station through a pressure line running along the route to the reservoir at the upper station.

The track system is usually single-track and has a passing point in the middle. Due to the special switch construction of the abt switch, each car is automatically guided to one of the two sidings. The narrow route reduces the space required and the effort involved in building bridges and tunnels.

Even if water were readily available (unless it had to be pumped up to the mountain station, which required energy), there were disadvantages to operating with water ballast. Winter operation became dangerous as soon as there was a risk of the water tanks or the brake-rack icing up. Likewise, the forced break that was necessary until the next trip due to refilling proved to be disadvantageous. In addition, the high operating weight and the high axle load of the wagons increased the maintenance effort for the entire system. Because of these limitations, only a few water-ballast-operated railways were built, and most have been converted to electric operation or have been discontinued.

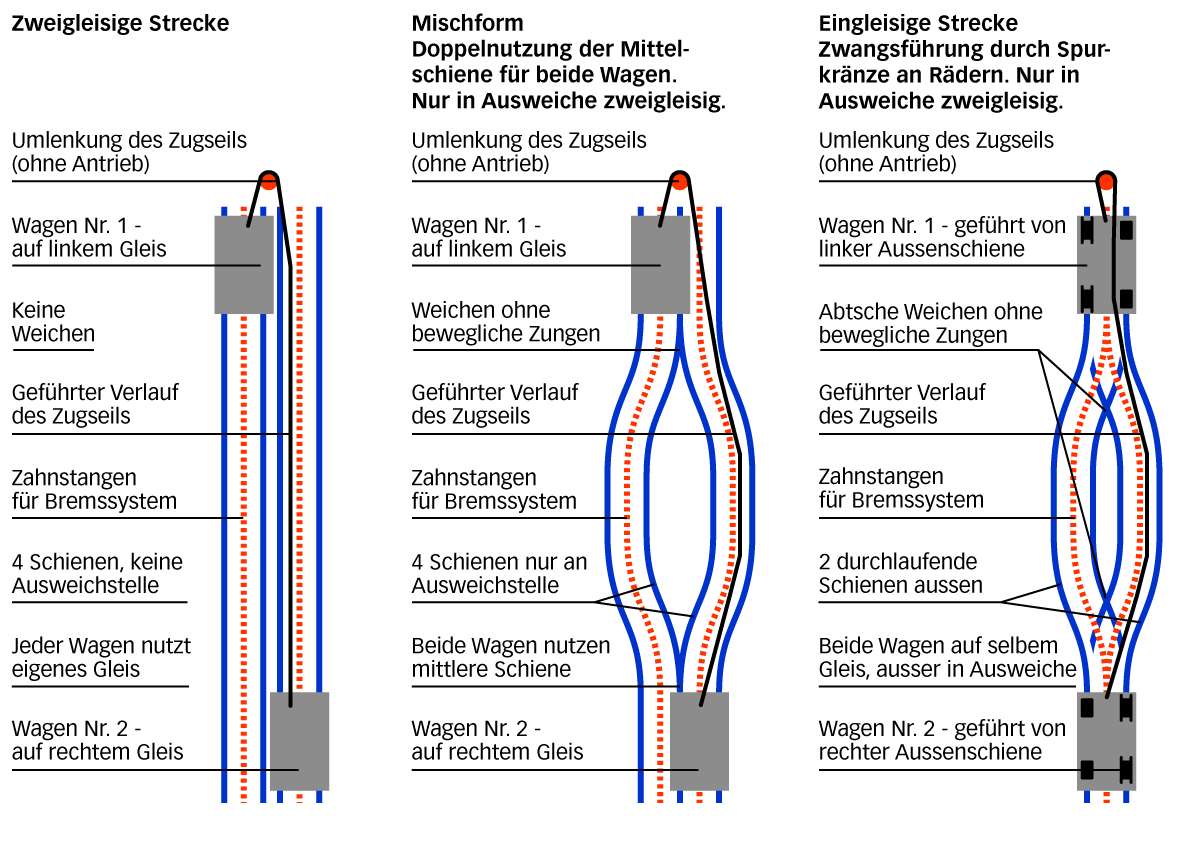
Schematic representation of water ballast railways. Examples of three basic types are: the Malbergbahn in Bad Ems, Germany, – closed (left), the Nerobergbahn in Wiesbaden, Germany (centre) and the Funicular Neuveville–Saint-Pierre in Freiburg, Switzerland (right).

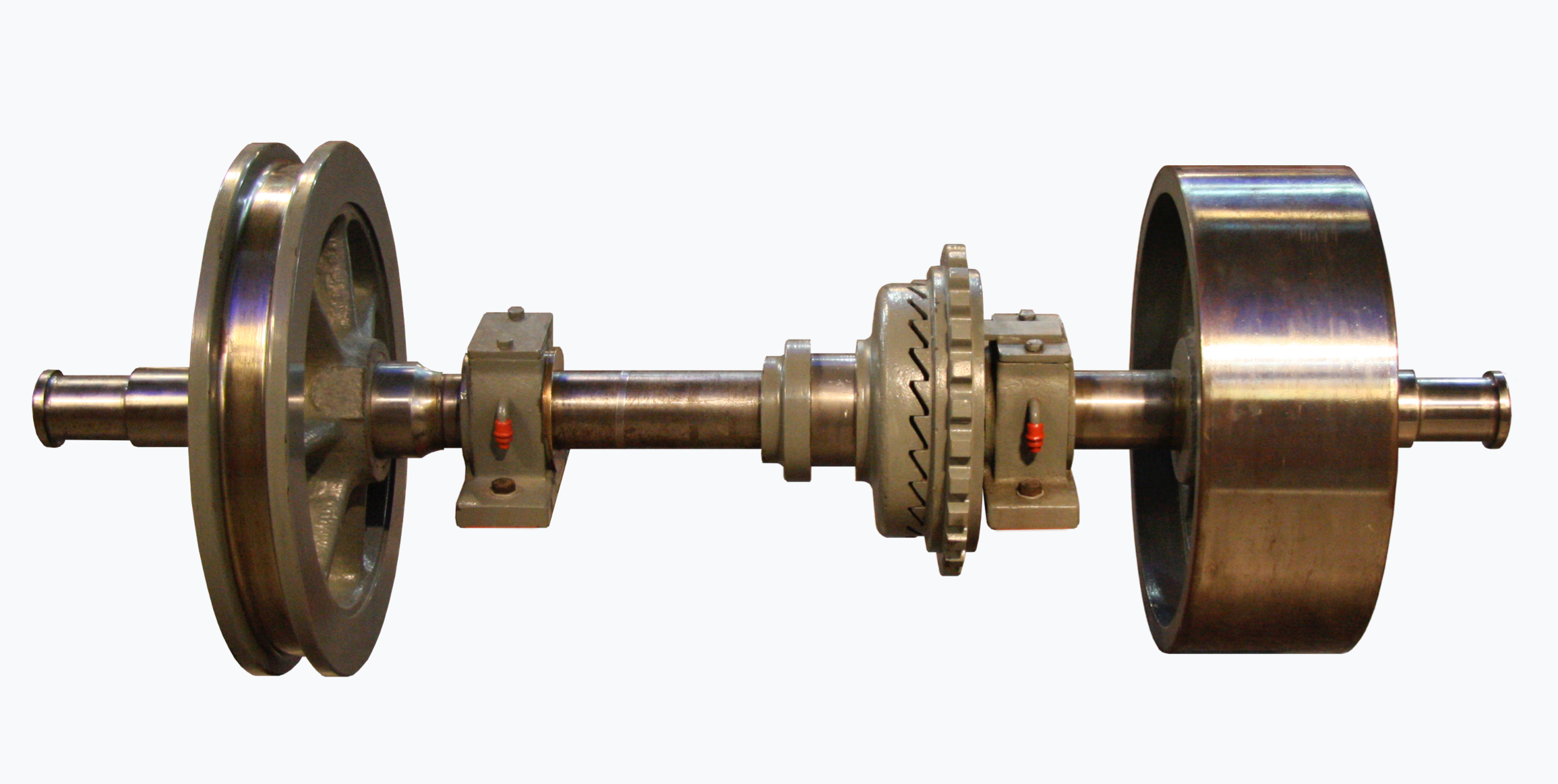
Wheelset of a two-rail funicular with the Abt switch turnout system

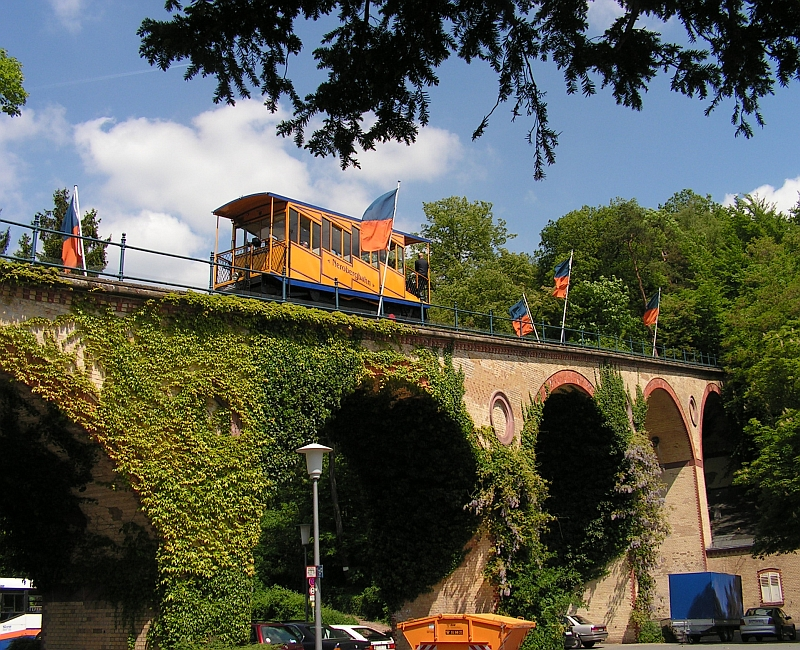
Nerobergbahn in Wiesbaden (1907)

== Railways ==
(sorted by opening year)

- Bom Jesus do Monte Funicular, Braga, Portugal (in operation since 1882, oldest in the world)
- Saltburn Cliff Lift, Saltburn-by-the-Sea, England (in operation since 1884)
- Leas Lift, Folkestone, England (in operation since 1885)
- Nerobergbahn, Wiesbaden, Germany (in operation since 1888)
- Lynton and Lynmouth Cliff Railway, Devon, England (in operation since 1890)
- Fribourg funicular, Fribourg, Switzerland (in operation since 1899)
- Centre for Alternative Technology Railway, Machynlleth, Wales (in operation since 1992)

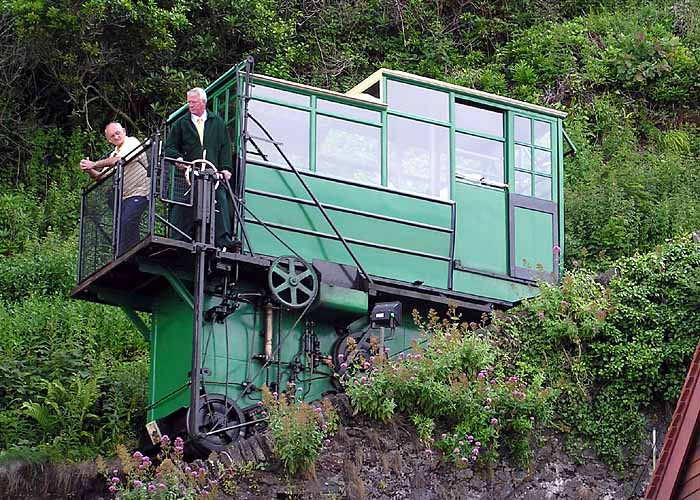
cars of the Lynton and Lynmouth Cliff Railway

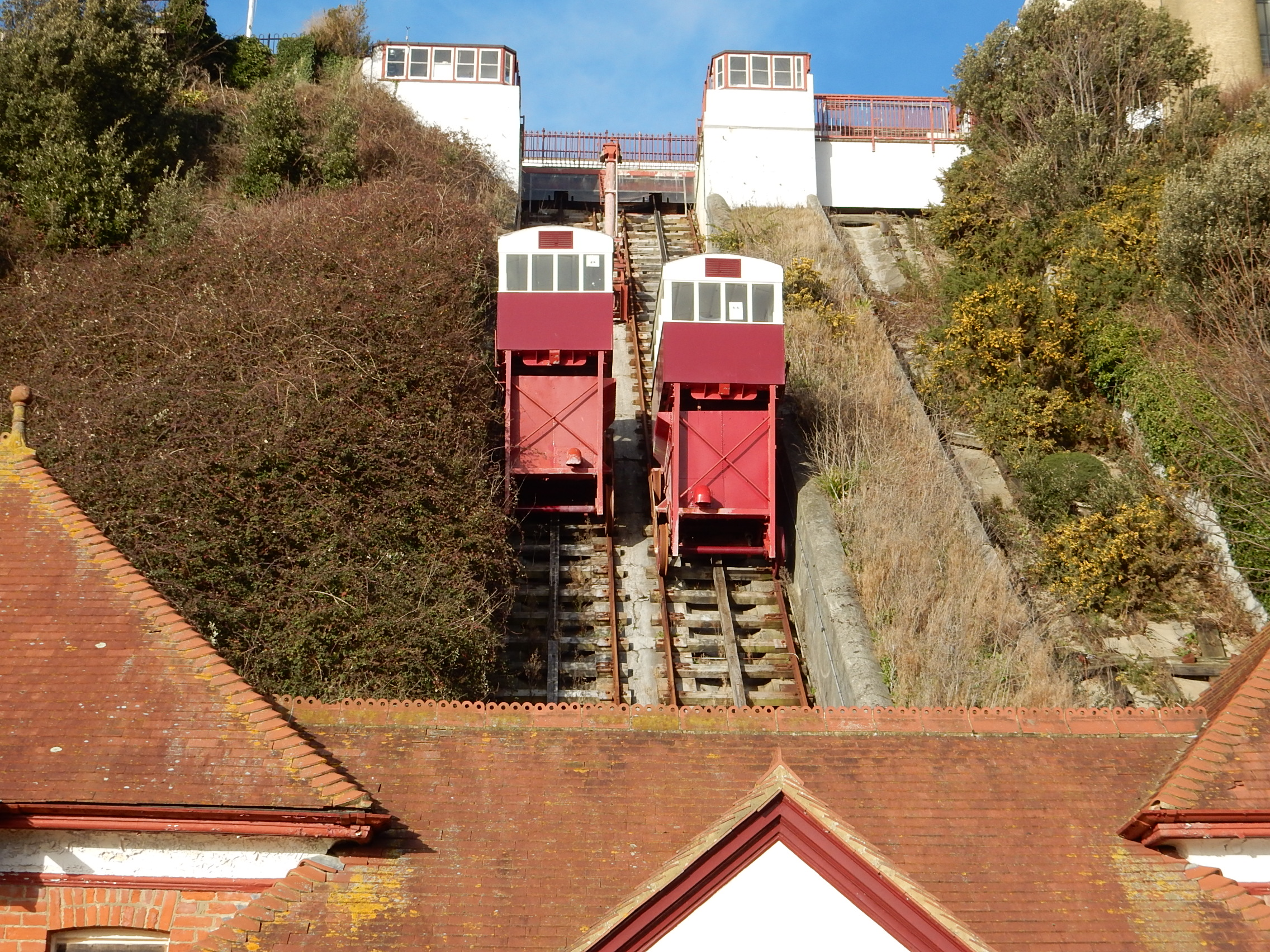
Leas Lift in Folkestone

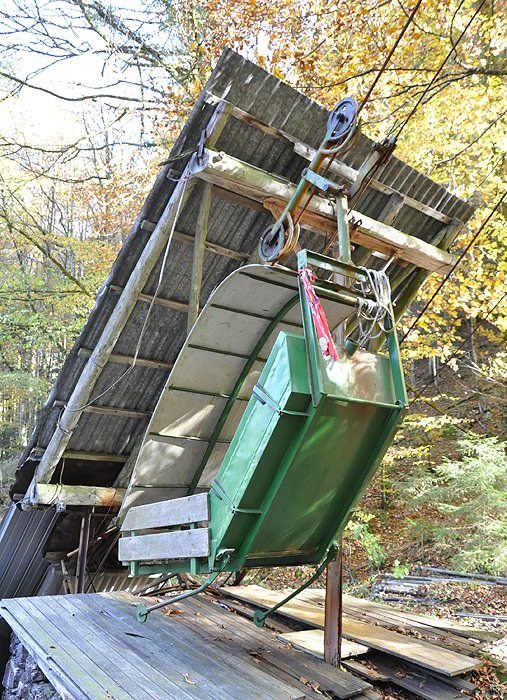
Obermatt–Unter Zingel in the Engelbergertal

=== Water balance railways converted to electric operation ===
Only a few examples are listed here, as many railways were first operated with water ballast.

==== Germany ====
- Turmbergbahn, Karlsruhe (opened 1888, converted 1966)
- Heidelberger Bergbahn (Molkenkurbahn) (opened 1890, converted 1907)

==== Austria ====
- Festungsbahn Salzburg (opened 1892, converted 1959)

==== Switzerland ====
(complete list of all funiculars in public passenger transport)

- Giessbachbahn, Bernese Oberland (opened in 1879, converted in 1912 to drive with Pelton turbine, 1948 to electric drive)
- Chemin de fer funiculaire Territet-Glion (opened 1883, converted 1975)
- Gütsch cable car, Lucerne (opened 1884, converted 1961)
- Marzilibahn, Bern (opened 1885, converted 1973)
- Funicular Lugano–Bahnhof SBB (opened 1886, converted 1955)
- Biel-Magglingen-Bahn (opened 1887, converted 1923)
- Thunersee-Beatenberg-Bahn (opened 1889, converted 1911) →
- Polybahn, Zurich (opened 1889, converted 1897)
- Funiculaire Ecluse–Plan, Neuchâtel (opened 1890, converted 1907)
- Lauterbrunnen–Grütschalp (opened in 1891, converted in 1901, cable car from 2006)
- Rheineck–Walzenhausen mountain railway (opened in 1896, cog railway from 1958)
- Cossonay funicular (opened 1897, converted 1982)

==== France ====
- Funiculaire de Montmartre, Paris (opened 1900, converted 1931)

==== Czech Republic ====
- Letná Funicular, de:Letná-Standseilbahn, Prague (opened 1891, converted 1903)
- Petřín Funicular, Prague (opened 1891, converted 1932)

=== Water balance railways converted to rack and pinion railway operation ===
- Mühleggbahn, St. Gallen (opened in 1894, converted in 1950, inclined elevator from 1975)
- Rheineck–Walzenhausen cable car (opened in 1896, converted in 1958)

=== Decommissioned water balance railways ===
==== Germany ====
- Krahnenbergbahn de:Krahnenbergbahn in Andernach am Rhein (opened in 1895, closed in 1941)
- Malbergbahn de:Malbergbahn in Bad Ems (opened in 1887, closed in 1979)
- Funicular Eschberg de:Standseilbahn Eschberg

==== Switzerland ====
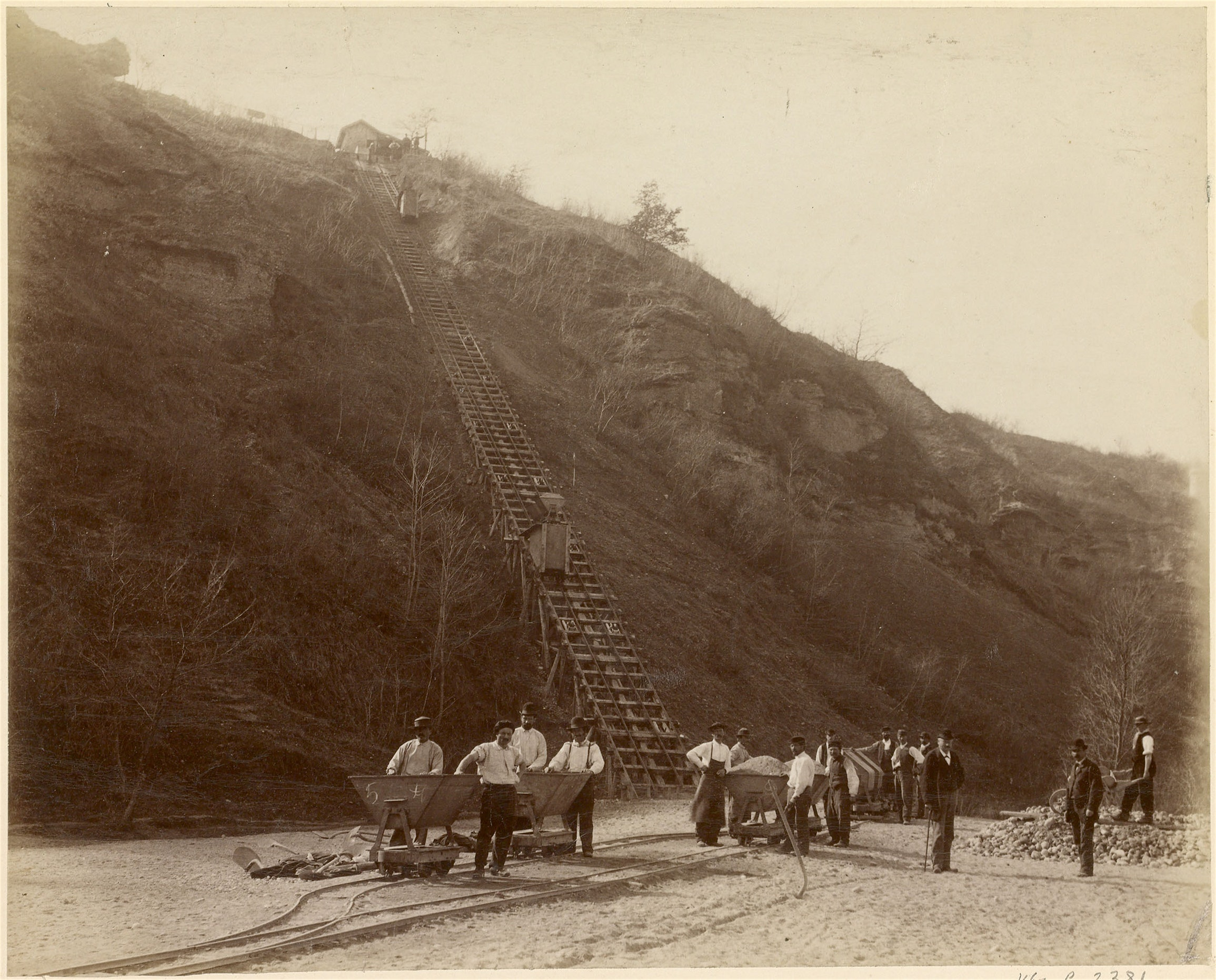
Geneva water ballast railway

- Gütschbahn in Lucerne, Switzerland (opened 1892, converted 1960, ceased operations 2008, inclined lift since 2015)
- Wartensteinbahn in the canton of St. Gallen, Switzerland (opened in 1892, ceased operations in 1963)
- Chocolate factory Chocolat Suchard in Neuchâtel-Serrières, Switzerland (opened 1892, ceased operations 1954)
- Geneva water ballast railway, Decauville material cable car opened around 1882 to the Bois de la Bâtie, closed
- Funiculaire Lausanne-Signal (opened 1899, closed 1948)

==== Other countries ====
- Funiculaire de Notre-Dame-de-la-Garde in Marseille, France (opened 1892, ceased operations 1967)
- Pokhvalinsky and Kremlyovsky in Nizhny Novgorod, Russia (opened July 15, 1896, ceased operations at the beginning of the 20th century)

== See also ==
- Cable railway

== Literature ==
- Walter Hefti: Railways all over the world. Inclined rope levels, funiculars, cableways. Birkhäuser Verlag, Basel and others. 1975, ISBN 3-7643-0726-9.
- Hans Waldburger (1979). "The last cable cars with water weight drive". Eisenbahn Amateur. pp. 593–597.
