= Königstuhl (Odenwald) =

Hill of the Odenwald Mountains in Heidelberg, Germany

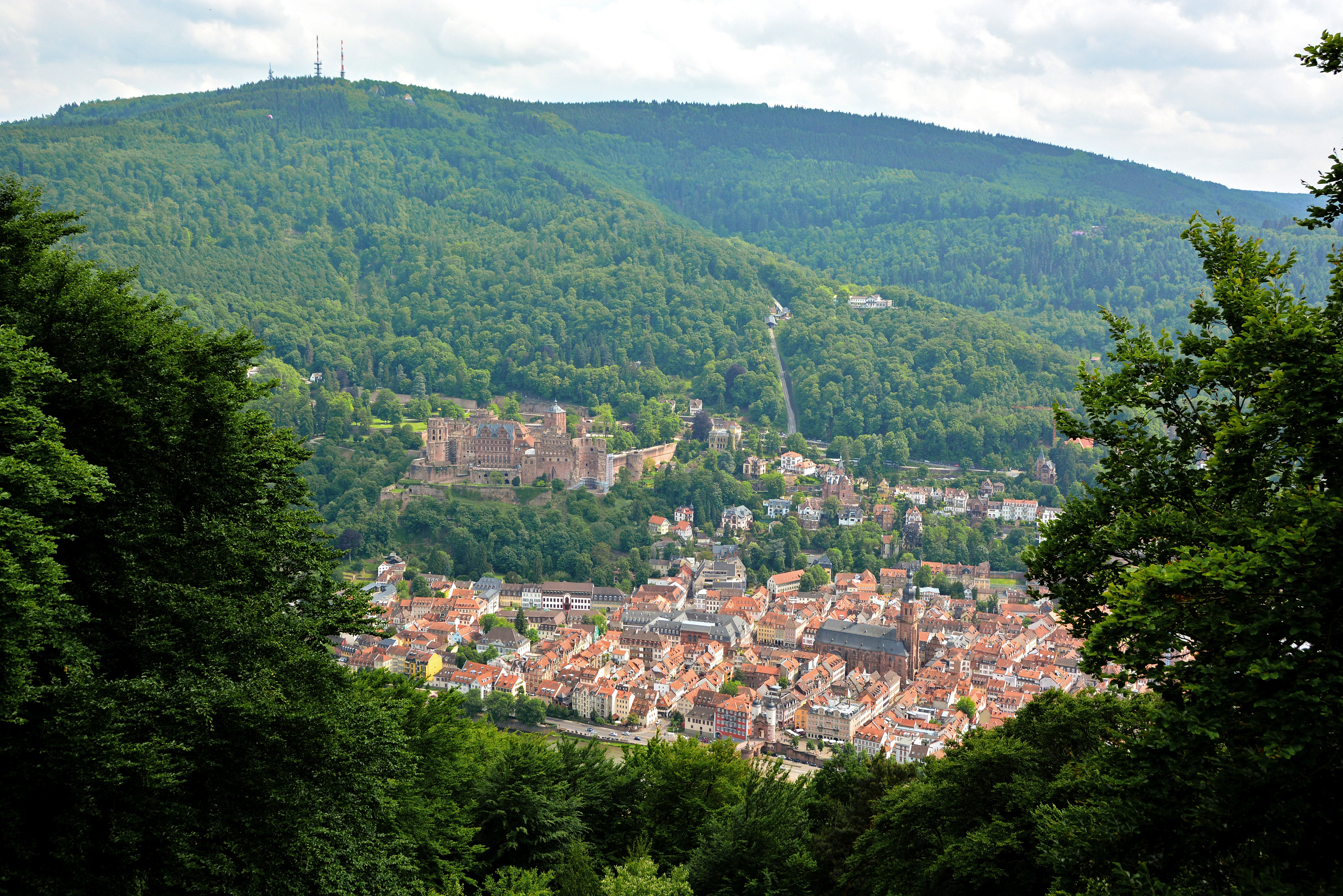
- Old town of Heidelberg, Heidelberg Castle and Königstuhl

Highest point
- Elevation: 567.8 m (1,863 ft)
- Coordinates: 49°23′53″N 8°43′34″E

Naming
- English translation: King's seat
- Language of name: German

Geography
- Location within Baden-Württemberg
- Location: Baden-Württemberg, Germany
- Parent range: Odenwald

The Königstuhl (German pronunciation: [ˈkøːnɪçˌʃtuːl]), is a 567.8 metres (1,863 ft) high hill in the Odenwald Mountains and in the city of Heidelberg, in the German state of Baden-Württemberg. The Königstuhl summit allows visitors views of the city of Heidelberg and the Neckar river. On days with good conditions the view extends to the Pfaelzerwald (Palatinate Forest), which is roughly 40–50 km away.

The hill is linked to Altstadt, by the Heidelberger Bergbahn, a two section historic funicular railway that stops at Heidelberg Castle, located on the lower slopes of the Königstuhl, the Molkenkur restaurant/hotel, and the ultimate stop at the mountain top which host a restaurant, an entertainment park for kids and various walking paths.

The Max Planck Institute for Astronomy is located near the summit of the Königstuhl, as is the historic Landessternwarte Heidelberg-Königstuhl astronomical observatory, established in 1898. Between 1912 and 1957, Karl Wilhelm Reinmuth discovered almost 400 asteroids whilst working from this observatory.

Several telecommunications facilities are located on the Königstuhl, including the Fernsehturm Heidelberg (Digital TV (DVB-T), Radio and Microwave), the Telecom Telecommunication Tower Heidelberg (Microwave and FM) and the now inactive Telecommunication Tower of US-Forces Heidelberg (Microwave).

== Climate ==
Königstuhl has a temperate Oceanic climate(Köppen: Cfb), similar to the city of Heidelberg, but with colder temperatures and much higher precipitation throughout the year.

Climate data for Heidelberg(Koeingsthul) (1991-2020)
Month	Jan	Feb	Mar	Apr	May	Jun	Jul	Aug	Sep	Oct	Nov	Dec	Year
Daily mean °C (°F)	0.8 (33.4)	1.4 (34.5)	4.7 (40.5)	8.6 (47.5)	12.7 (54.9)	16.0 (60.8)	18.0 (64.4)	17.8 (64.0)	13.6 (56.5)	9.5 (49.1)	4.5 (40.1)	1.7 (35.1)	9.1 (48.4)
Average precipitation mm (inches)	82.1 (3.23)	72.6 (2.86)	77.3 (3.04)	60.3 (2.37)	96.0 (3.78)	86.5 (3.41)	98.7 (3.89)	84.9 (3.34)	79.6 (3.13)	88.5 (3.48)	90.0 (3.54)	103.0 (4.06)	1,019.5 (40.13)
Mean monthly sunshine hours	60	85.7	136.4	185.6	209.6	217.7	230.7	222.3	169.6	111.7	62.7	49.3	1,741.3
Source: Deutscher Wetterdienst

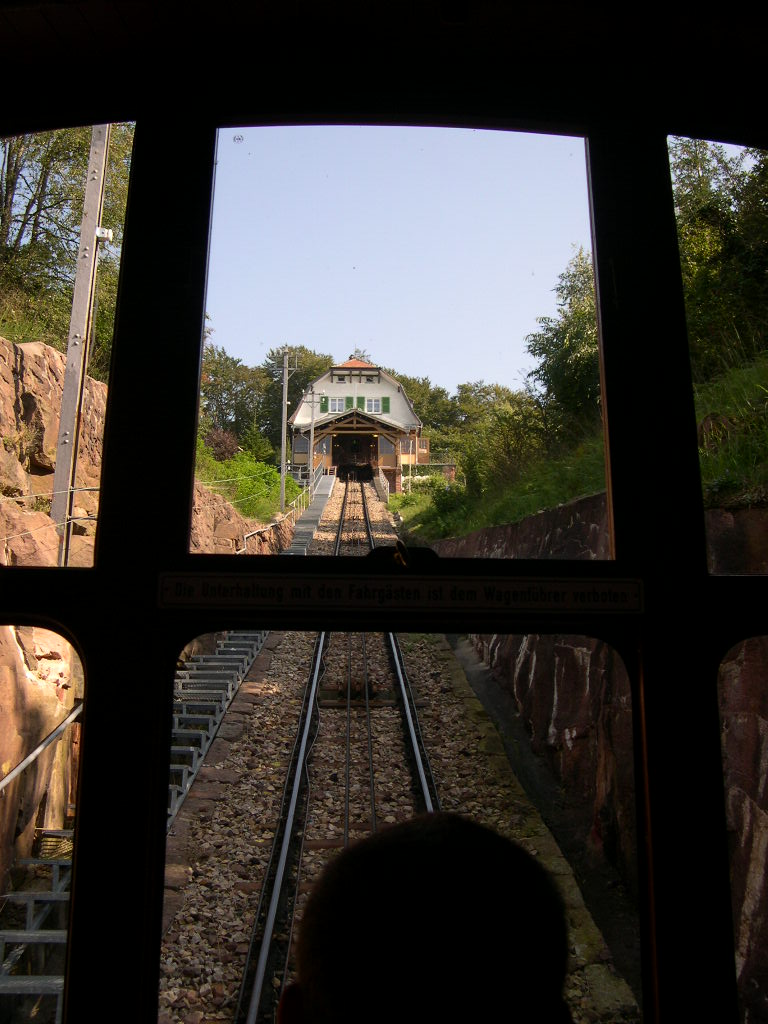
Approaching the Königstuhl funicular station

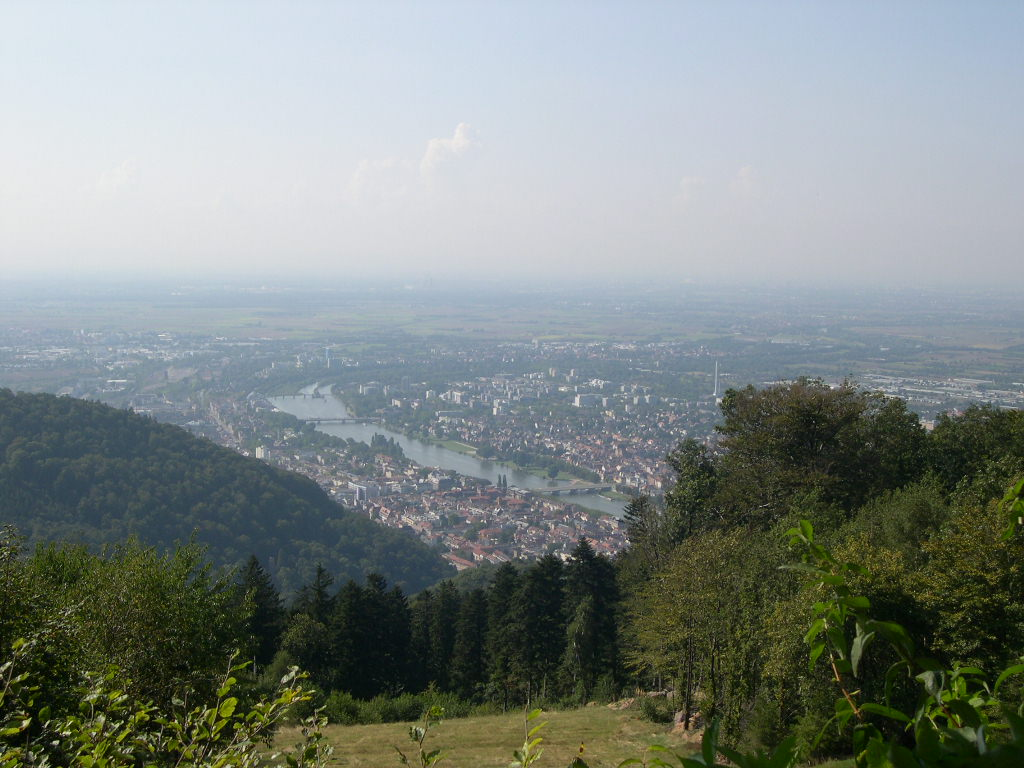
Heidelberg from the Königstuhl
