= Fernsehturm Heidelberg =

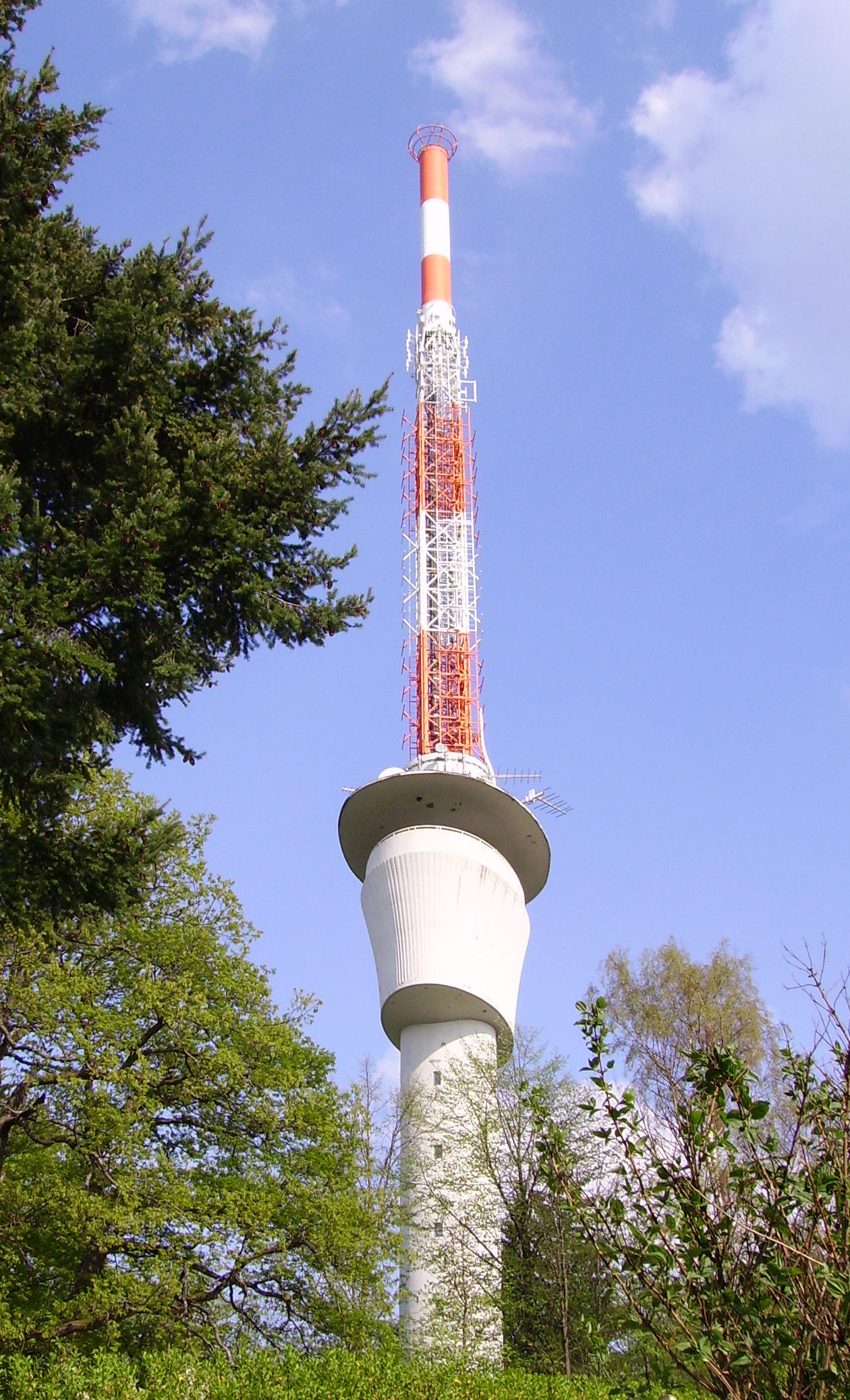
The Fernsehturm Heidelberg

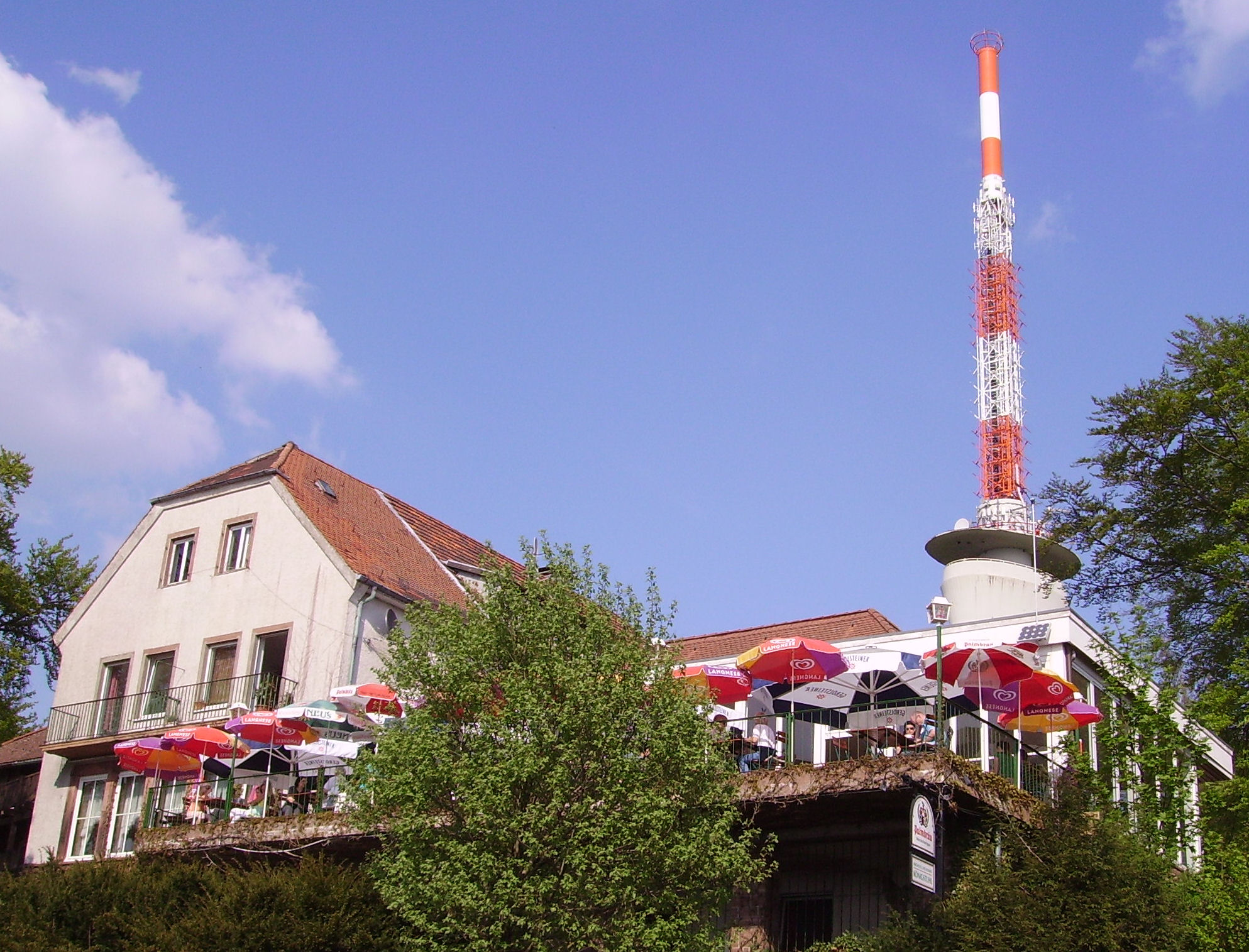
The Fernsehturm Heidelberg

The Fernsehturm Heidelberg is a transmission tower for FM and DVB-T on the Königstuhl hill of Heidelberg at . It was the property of the City of Heidelberg and sold to the SWR. Because of its exposed location on the crest of the hill the tower itself is only 82 meters high.

The Heidelberg TV tower has an open-air observation deck 30 metres up its height, which can be reached by an elevator. The observation deck is now permanently closed for visitors due to safety concerns. The sale of the tower sealed the fate of the observation deck which used to enable tourist a spectacular 360 degrees view of the region.

In the first years of its existence the tower was also used as a water tower. The water tank is located within the main body behind the observation deck.

Public and private channels across 6 multiplexes are broadcast from the TV tower. In 2016, the tower was one of the first to introduce DVB-T2 in Germany.

4 analog FM radio channels are broadcast from this tower. SWR1 Baden-Württemberg (97.8 MHz), SWR Kultur (88.8 MHz), SWR3 (99.9 MHz) and SWR4 Baden-Württemberg (104.1 MHz). Also digital radio multiplexes (DAB+) are broadcast from this tower on DAB channels 5C, 9B, 9D, and 11B.

The Telecom Telecommunication Tower Heidelberg and former Telecommunication Tower of US-Forces Heidelberg (returned to the state of Baden-Württemberg) are located close by. Both are off limits to the public.

== See also ==
- List of towers
