= Leas Lift =

Funicular railway in Folkestone, Kent, England

Coordinates: 51.0771°N 1.1785°E

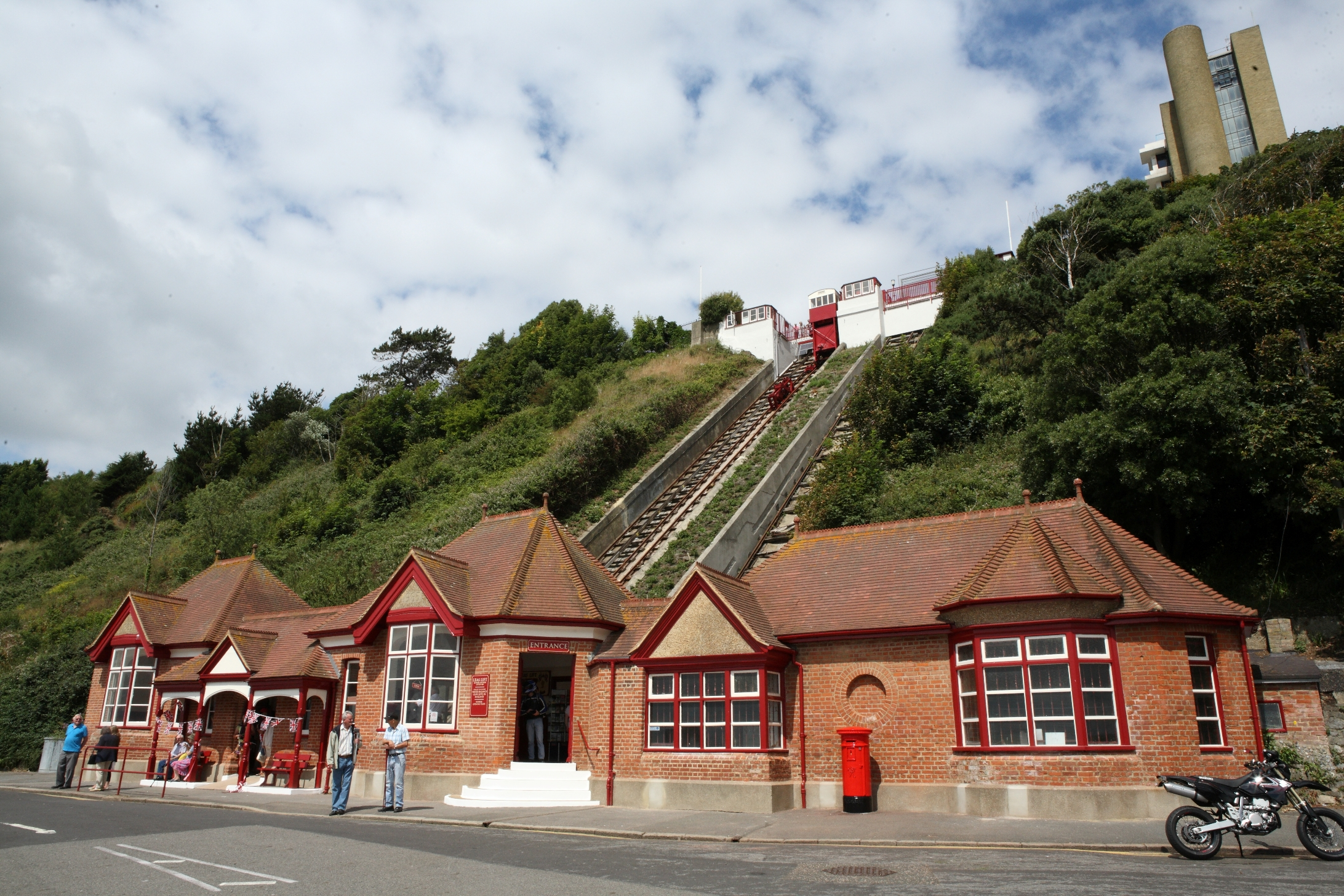

Overview
- Owner: The Folkestone Estate (formerly the Radnor Estate)
- Locale: Folkestone, Kent
- Termini: Seafront (at the base); The promenade (at the top)
- Stations: 2

Service
- Type: Funicular
- Operator: Folkestone Leas Lift Company
- Ridership: Over 36.4 million people since opening

History
- Opened: 1885

Folkestone Pier and Lift Act 1884
- Act of Parliament
- Parliament of the United Kingdom
- Long title: An Act for the construction maintenance and regulation of a Pier and Lift at Folkestone in the county of Kent and for other purposes.
- Citation: 47 & 48 Vict. c. ccxxxvii

Dates
- Royal assent: 7 August 1884

Text of statute as originally enacted

Folkestone Pier and Lift Act 1890
- Act of Parliament
- Parliament of the United Kingdom
- Long title: An Act to empower the Folkestone Pier and Lift Company to raise further capital and for other purposes.
- Citation: 53 & 54 Vict. c. cxlvii

Dates
- Royal assent: 4 August 1890

Other legislation
- Repealed by: Folkestone Pier and Lift Act 1937

Status: Repealed

Text of statute as originally enacted

Folkestone Pier and Lift Act 1937
- Act of Parliament
- Parliament of the United Kingdom
- Long title: An Act to empower the Folkestone Pier and Lift Company to sell by agreement the undertaking of that company and for other purposes.
- Citation: 1 Edw. 8 & 1 Geo. 6. c. xxxvii

Dates
- Royal assent: 10 June 1937

Text of statute as originally enacted

The Leas Lift is a grade II* listed funicular railway that carried passengers between the seafront and the promenade in Folkestone, Kent. Originally installed in 1885, it is one of the oldest water lifts in the UK.

The lift has been closed since June 2009 when Folkestone and Hythe District Council’s lease ran out and it was decided that the lift was too expensive to run.

Campaigners subsequently protested against the closure of the lift and in April 2010, it was announced that the lift was to be restored.

The restored lift is scheduled to reopen in 2027.

== Operation ==
The lift operates using water and gravity and is controlled from a small cabin at the top of the cliff. It has carried more than 36.4 million people since it opened, in a process that is especially energy efficient. The lift has a very small carbon footprint, as it emits no pollution and recycles all of the water used to drive the cars.

== Restoration works ==
Crofton Consulting was appointed as lead consultant to provide structural engineering design for the restoration. Crofton won the Building Structures award at the ACE Engineering Excellence Awards in May 2011 and won the Restoration award at the ICE Engineering Excellence Awards in June 2011 for its work on the lift. G A Harpers was appointed as the main contractor to carry out the necessary construction work.

The renovation involved replacing the mechanical and electrical wiring and ensuring that all necessary safety standards in the two cars, the control systems and stations, were met. There was also a focus on restoring the associated power pumps that control the lift at the top and bottom stations.

The wheel bearings on the lift cars were all found to be damaged by corrosion so the wheels were re-machined to provide the correct running profile. Additionally, the corroded steelwork support structures within the buried water storage tanks, which were leaking, were inspected and replaced.

The operation of the Folkestone lift was then taken over by The Folkestone Leas Lift Community Interest Company on behalf of the community as a non-profit-making organisation. It opened the attraction as a living museum.

In January 2017, the lift was closed again following an HSE inspection, which determined that a secondary fail-safe braking system must be installed before the lift could be re-opened. £80,000 was raised to conduct the preliminary works required to reinstate the lift, including a full engineering survey. A new charity, the Folkestone Leas Lift Company Charity was set up, and with funding from the Radnor Estate and the Roger De Haan Charitable Trust, aims to raise funds to help repair the lift, and to create and implement a sustainable long-term plan for its operation. As of May 2025, the charity expects the lift to reopen in early 2026.

== In popular culture ==
In June 1991, the lift was seen in an episode of The Darling Buds of May.

== See also ==
- List of funicular railways
