= Heidelberger Bergbahn =

Funicular railway in Heidelberg, Germany

Coordinates: 49°24′26.10″N 8°42′53.96″E

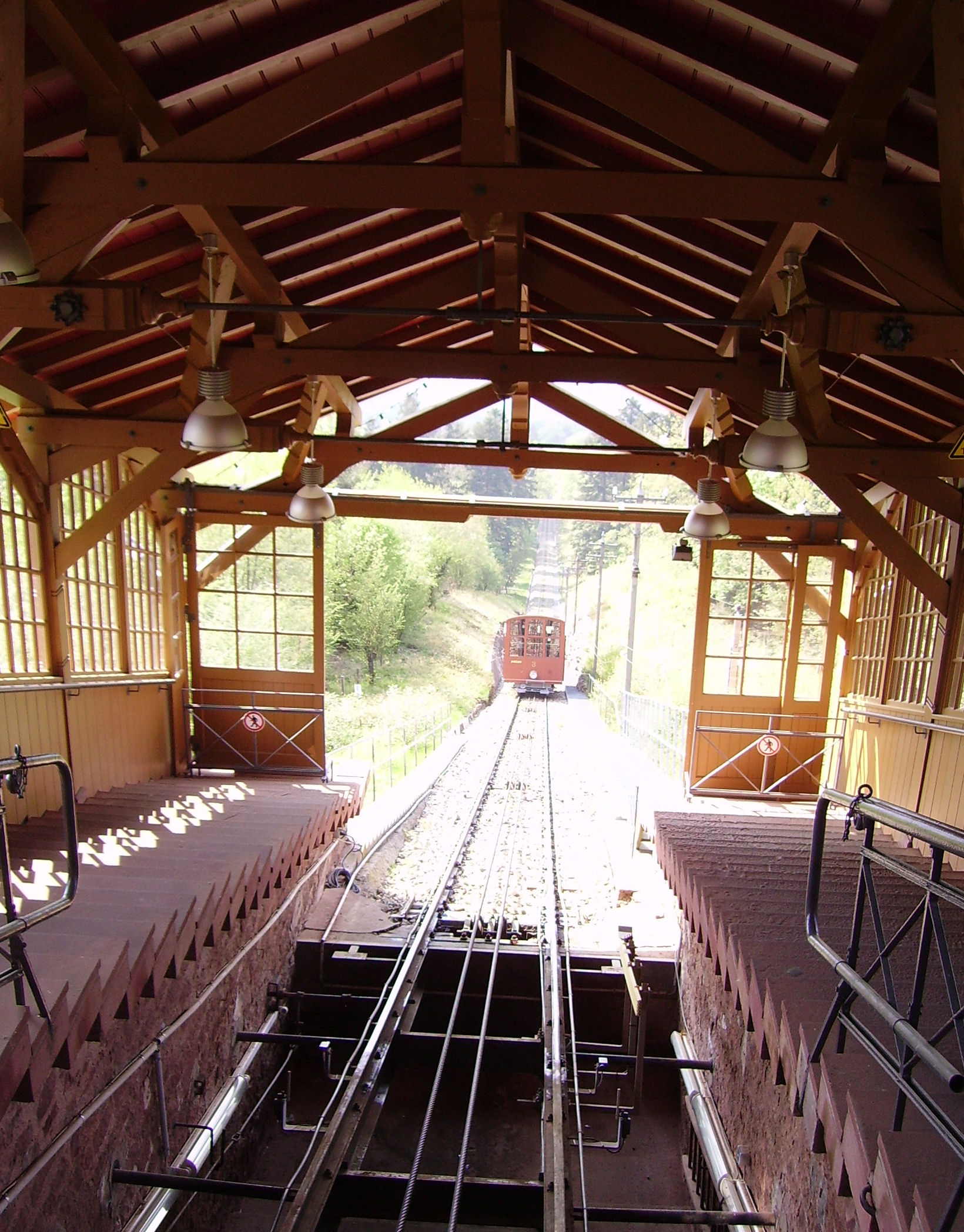
Upper station at Königstuhl

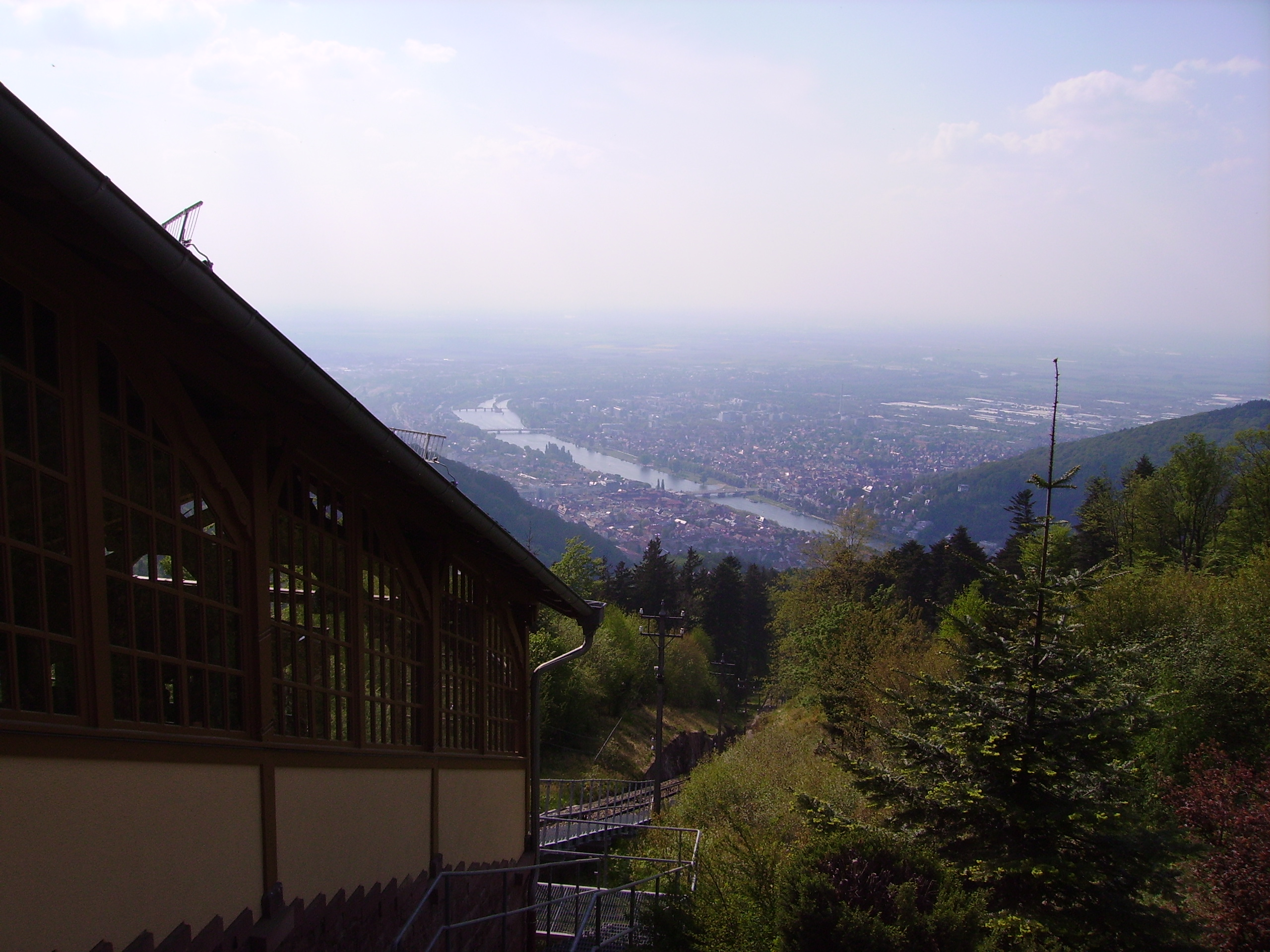
View from the upper station

The Heidelberg Mountain Railway (German: Heidelberger Bergbahn) is a two-section funicular railway in the city of Heidelberg, Germany. The first section runs from a lower station at Kornmarkt in Heidelberg's Altstadt, via an intermediate station at Heidelberg Castle, to an upper station at Molkenkur. Here passengers may change to the second section, which runs up the Königstuhl, a nearby hill with good views over the city and the River Neckar.

The upper and lower sections of the funicular have different histories and are sometimes referred to separately by the names Königstuhlbahn and Molkenkurbahn respectively. These two sections present quite different appearances, with the upper section using wooden bodied cars of historic appearance, whilst the lower section uses modern style cars. Similarly the upper stations at Molkenkur and Königstuhl are to the original design, whilst those further down the hill at Kornmarkt and Heidelberg Castle present a more modern image.

The Heidelberger Bergbahn is operated by the Heidelberger Straßen- und Bergbahn AG (HSB), the operator of buses and trams in Heidelberg. The funicular predominantly serves tourist traffic. The lower section runs every ten minutes throughout the day, whilst the connecting upper section runs every twenty minutes throughout the day. The services start at 9 a.m. and end at times that vary from summer to winter.

== Lower section ==
A video taken through the front window of the Heidelberger Bergbahn car showing the one and a half minute descent from Heidelberg Castle to Kornmarkt in the Altstadt of Heidelberg

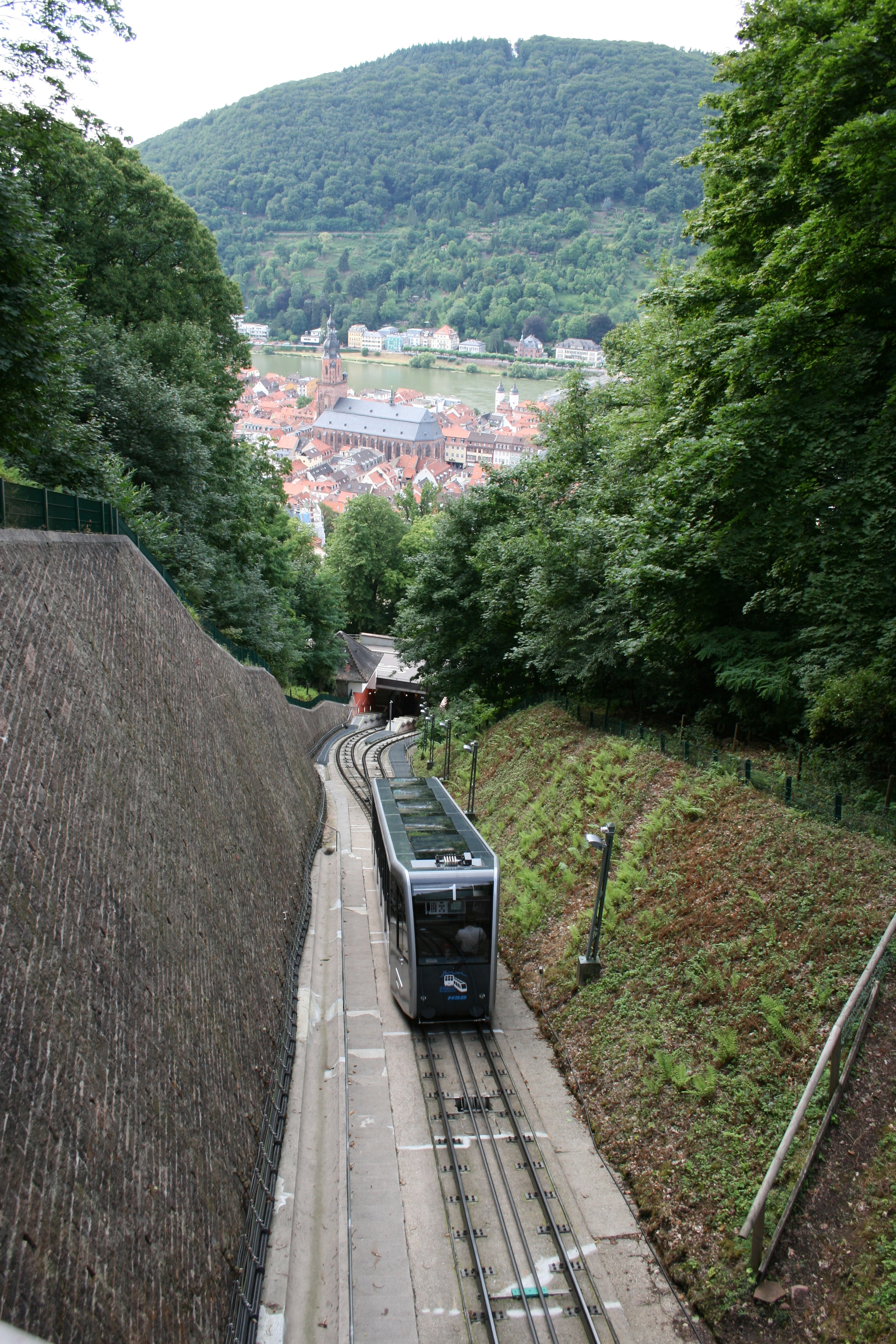
A car on the lower section

The lower section of the funicular (the Molkenkurbahn) opened in 1890, and its original form used the water ballast system of propulsion, similar to that still used by the Nerobergbahn in Wiesbaden. The line was rebuilt to use a conventional electric drive in 1907. Between 1961 and 1962 the section was rebuilt and new cars provided in order to handle the volume of traffic to Heidelberg Castle; at this time new stations were built at Kornmarkt and Heidelberg Castle. The section was closed between October 2003 and March 2005; during the closure period the existing cars were scrapped and replaced by new and larger cars to a modern design, and Kornmarkt and Heidelberg Castle stations were again rebuilt.

The section has the following technical parameters:

- Length: 471 metres (1,545 ft)
- Height: 171 metres (561 ft)
- Maximum steepness: 43 %
- Configuration: Single track with passing loop
- Journey time: 5 minutes
- Cars: 2
- Capacity: 130 passengers per car
- Track gauge: 1,000 mm (3 ft 3 3/8 in)
- Traction: Electricity

== Upper section ==
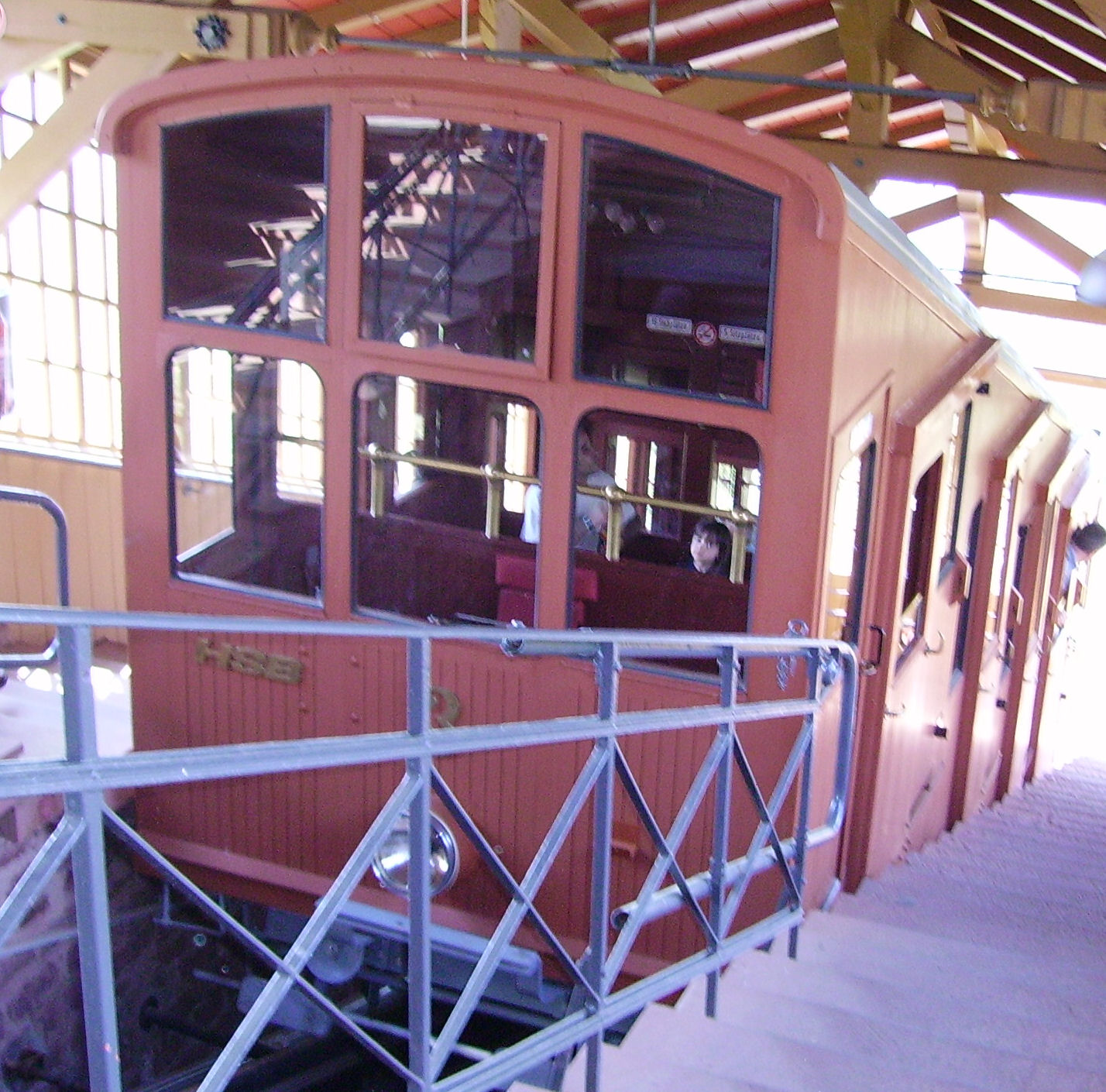
Upper section car

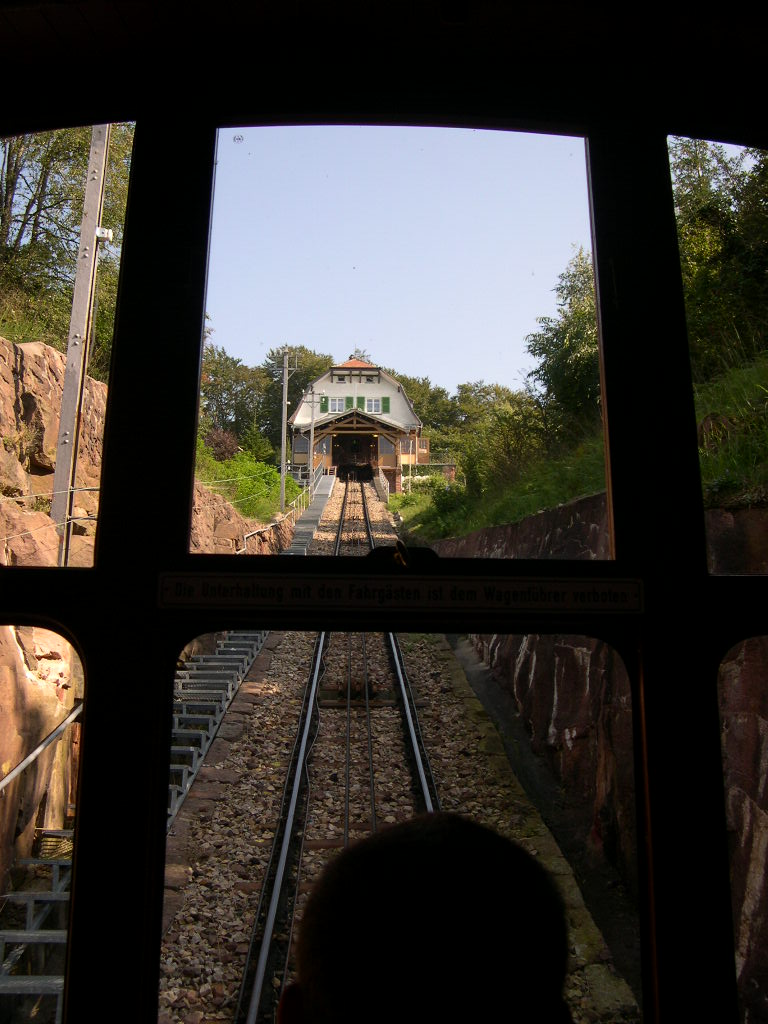
Approaching the Königstuhl station

The upper section of the funicular (the Königstuhlbahn) opened in 1907, and used a conventional electric drive from the start. It continued to run in its original form until April 2003, when changes to safety regulations forced it to shut down. The section reopened in March 2005; during the closure period the existing cars were rebuilt and provided with new wooden bodies to the original design.

The section has the following technical parameters:

- Length: 1,020 metres (3,346 ft)
- Height: 260 metres (853 ft)
- Maximum steepness: 41 %
- Configuration: Single track with passing loop
- Journey time: 9 minutes
- Cars: 2
- Capacity: 50 passengers per car
- Track gauge: 1,000 mm (3 ft 3 3/8 in)
- Traction: Electricity

== See also ==
- List of funicular railways
