= Fribourg funicular =

Water-powered funicular railway in Switzerland

Coordinates: 46°48′14″N 7°9′27″E

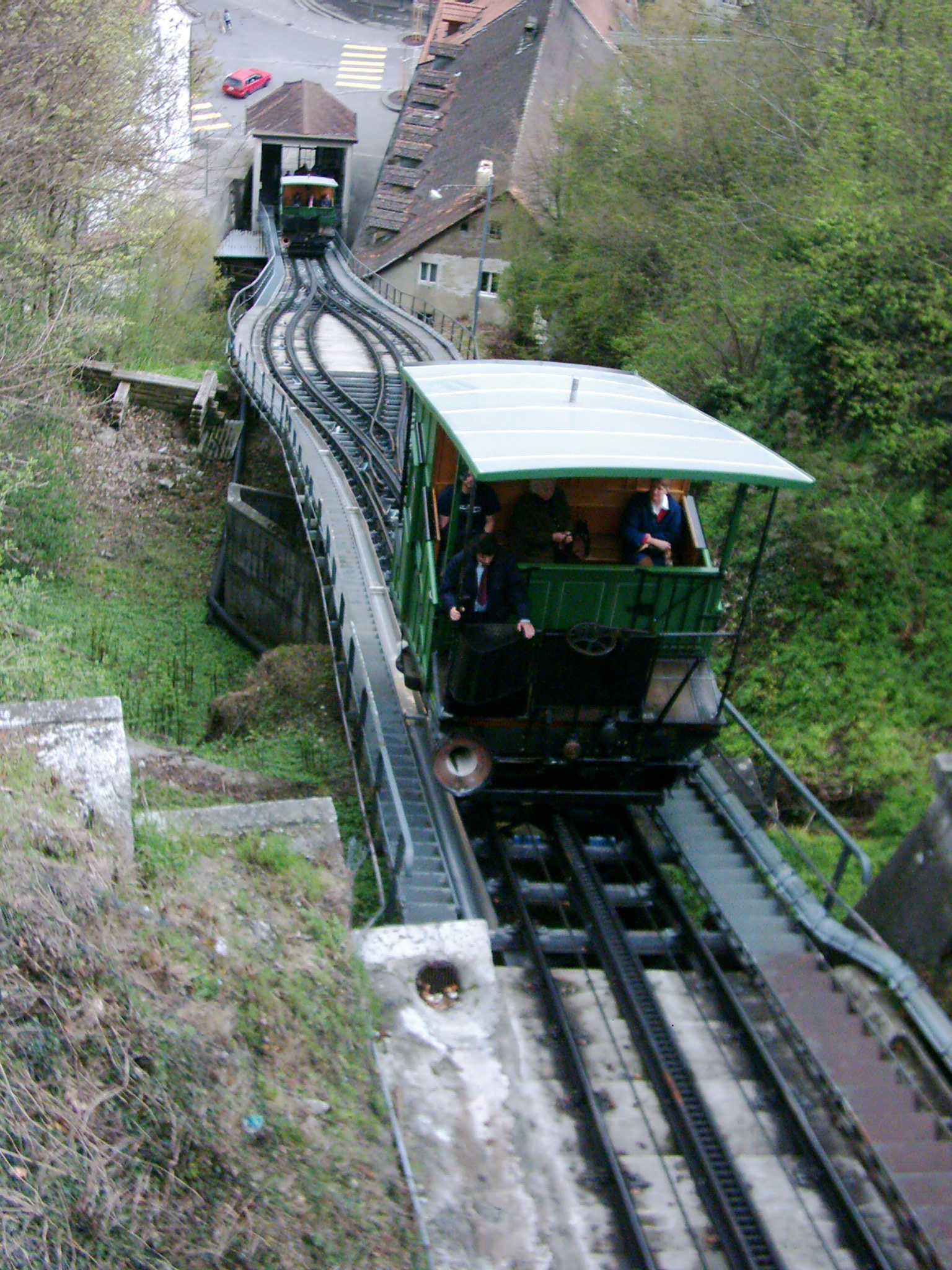

Overview
- Other name: Neuveville - Saint-Pierre funicular
- Native name: Funiculaire Neuveville - Saint-Pierre à Fribourg
- Status: in operation
- Owner: Transports publics Fribourgeois (since 2000); Société du Funiculaire Neuveville-St-Pierre à Fribourg SA (-1977); Transports en commun de Fribourg SA (1977-2000)
- Locale: Fribourg, Switzerland
- Termini: Neuveville; St-Pierre
- Stations: 2
- Website: tpf.ch

Service
- Type: Commuter funicular
- System: Wastewater-powered funicular railway
- Route number: 2030
- Operator(s): Transports publics Fribourgeois
- Rolling stock: 2 Von Roll cabins

History
- Commenced: 1898
- Opened: 4 February 1899 (127 years ago)
- Completed: 1899

Technical
- Line length: 121 metres (397 ft)
- Number of tracks: 1 with passing loop
- Character: Commuter and touristic funicular
- Track gauge: 1,200 mm (3 ft 11 1/4 in)
- Electrification: (water counterbalancing)
- Operating speed: 1.2 metres per second (3.9 ft/s)
- Highest elevation: 609 metres (1,998 ft)
- Maximum incline: 55%

The Fribourg funicular, also known as the Neuveville - Saint-Pierre funicular, is a funicular railway in the Swiss town of Fribourg. It is powered by the use of wastewater as ballast.

== History ==
The Fribourg funicular was opened February 4, 1899. It connects the Saint-Pierre and Neuveville neighborhoods of Fribourg. It closed briefly for maintenance in 1996 and 2014.

== Operation ==
The rolling stock is made up of two opposing Von Roll cabins, which act as counterweights. Wastewater from the Saint-Pierre neighborhood is poured into the upper cabin, driving it downwards and the other cabin upwards. The wastewater is then dumped back out into the lower Neuveville neighborhood's sewer system. Racks are present at the bottom station for braking.

== See also ==
- List of funiculars in Switzerland
