= Centre for Alternative Technology Railway =

Coordinates: 52°37′22.9″N 3°50′25.55″W

Centre for Alternative Technology Railway.

Another view of the funicular.

The Centre for Alternative Technology Railway is a funicular opened in May 1992 and located in the Centre for Alternative Technology, Powys, Wales.

== Technical parameters ==
- Length: 53 metres (173.9 ft)
- Height: 30 metres (98.4 ft)
- Gradient: 57%
- Carriages weigh: 3.5 tonnes (3.4 long tons; 3.9 short tons) each, plus a maximum of 1.5 tonnes (1.48 long tons; 1.65 short tons) for the water tanks.
- Cables weigh: 500 kg (1,102 lb)
- Cars: 2
- Track gauge: 5 ft 6 in (1,676 mm)
- Traction: Water ballast
- Runs per hour: 10–12
- Average speed: 0.5 m/s (1.6 ft/s)
