= Nerotalanlagen =

Park in Wiesbaden, Germany

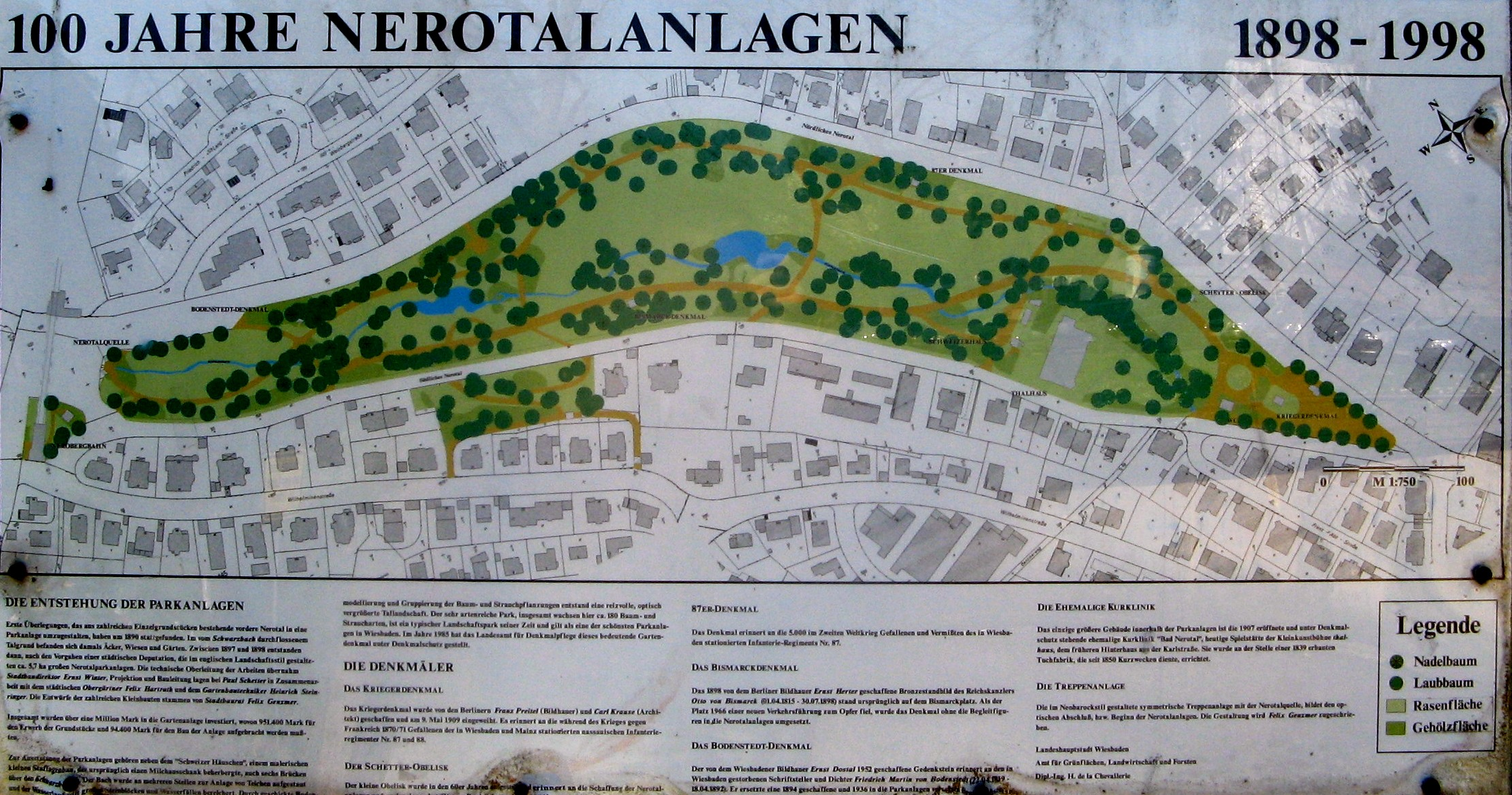
- Map of Nerotalanlagen
- Interactive map of Nerotalanlagen
- Location: Wiesbaden, Hesse, Germany
- Coordinates: 50°05′37″N 08°13′57″E
- Created: 1897

The Nerotalanlagen (Nero Valley Park) is a park in Wiesbaden, Hesse, Germany. The English landscape garden was built in the 19th century in the north of the city, below the Neroberg, along the stream valley of the Schwarzbach creek. The listed historic park features a great variety of plants and several monuments.

== History ==
The park was created in the style of an English landscape garden in 1897 and 1898, when the town was fashioned as a major spa. It is located in the north of the city, below the Neroberg, and follows the Schwarzbach creek for approximately 1 kilometre (0.62 mi). The valley, which provides fresh air to the spa area, was intentionally left free of buildings. The park was created aimed at remaining close to nature. It features singular trees, around 6000 different kinds of plants, the Schweizer Häuschen, and six stone bridges.

To the north of the park, the Nerobergbahn funicular runs to the Neroberg. The two roads in the east and west are lined with villas. In the south, the Franco-Prussian War memorial marks the end at the Taunusstrasse. It was erected in 1909, designed by Karl Krause and hewn by Franz Pritel, in memory of battles at Wörth, Wissembourg, Sedan and Paris.

The Schwarzbach creek is dammed a few times in the park, creating ponds and waterfalls, and is lined with meadows and a playground. It features monuments for Bismarck, Carl Koch, who was advisor for the town's water supply, and Friedrich von Bodenstedt, a poet who lived in Wiesbaden from 1878 to 1892 and was buried on the nearby Nordfriedhof.

The park was listed as a historic monument in 1985.

== Gallery ==
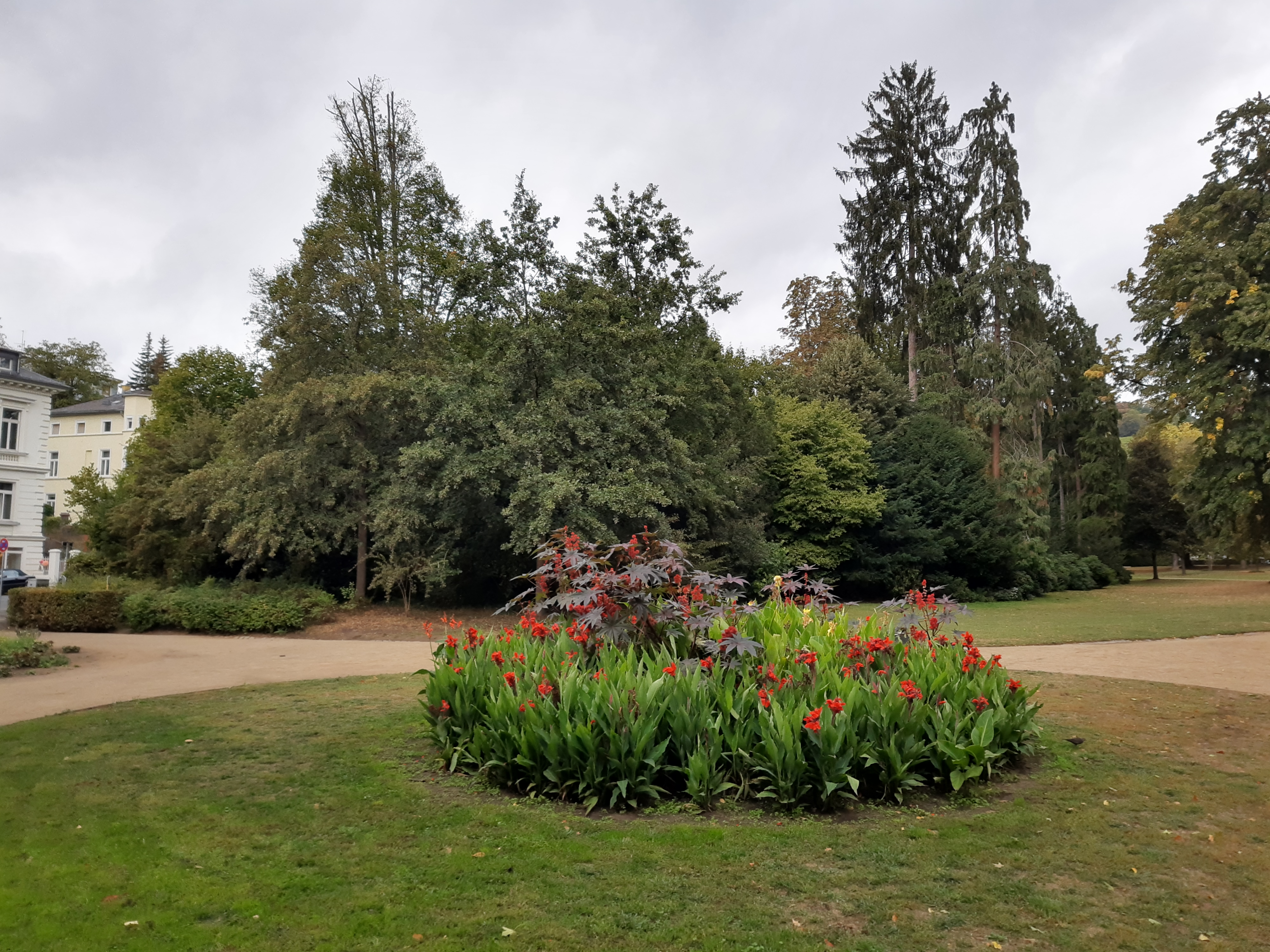
Flowerbed near southern entrance

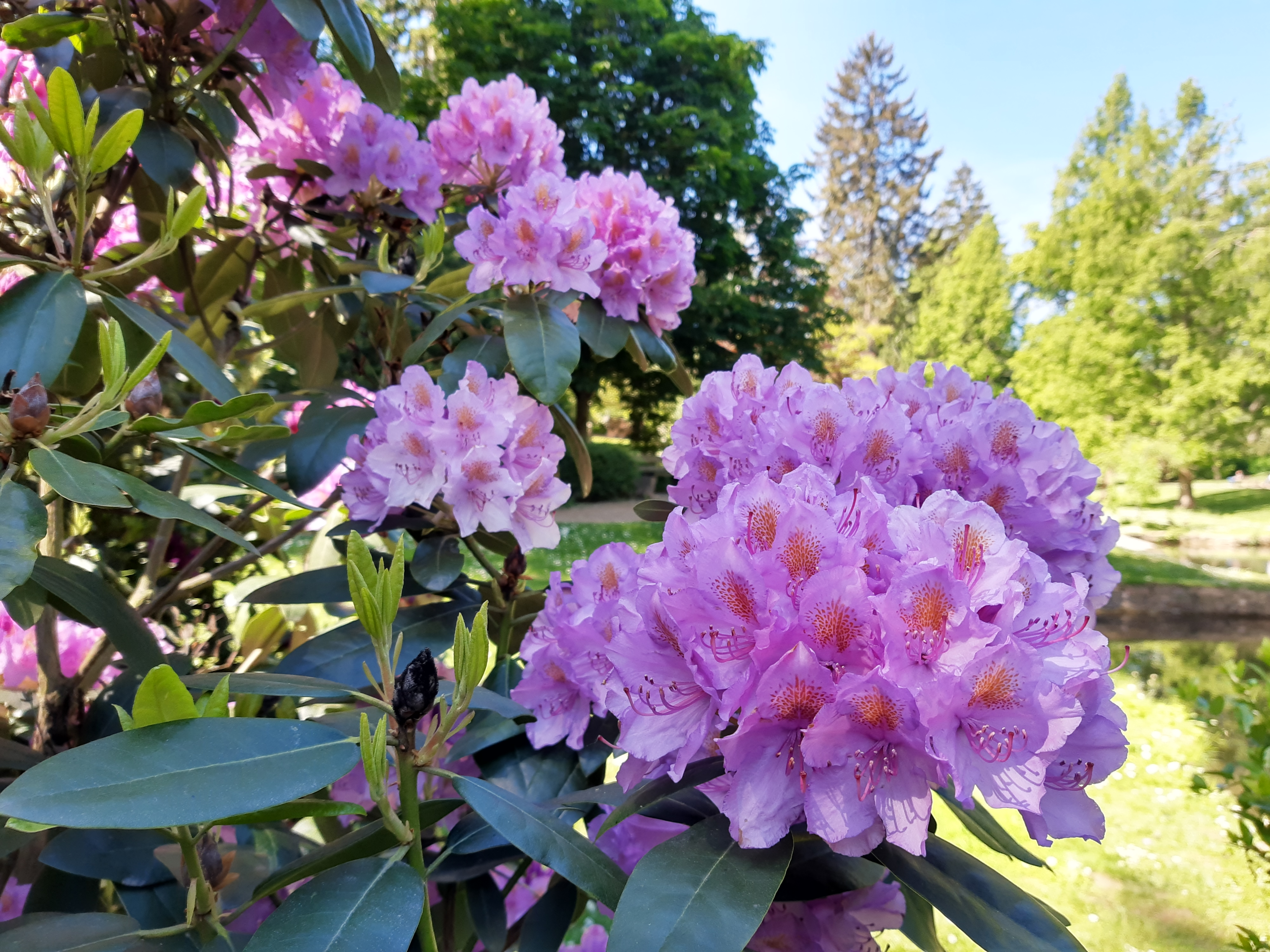
Rhododendron

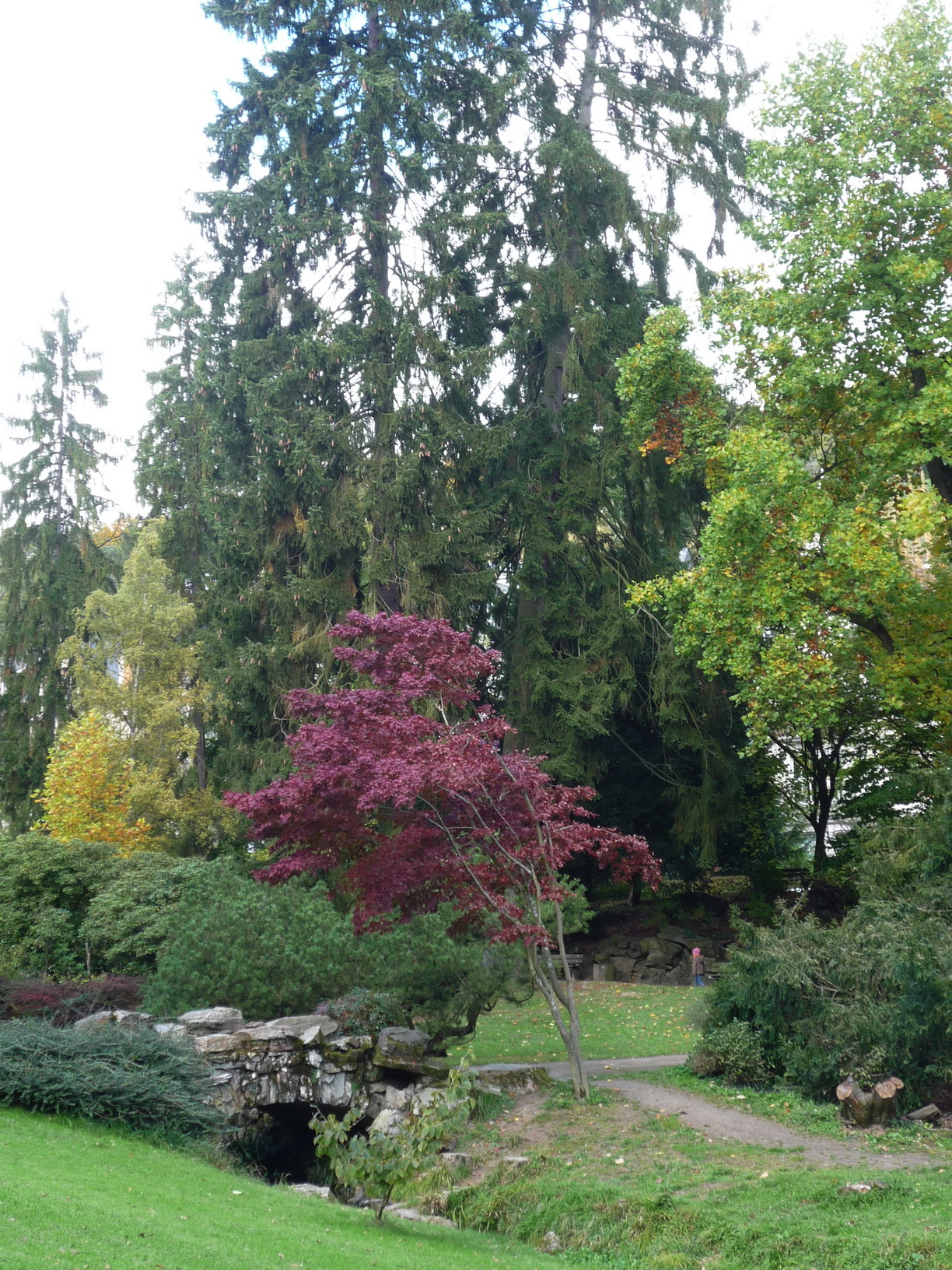
Autumn in the park

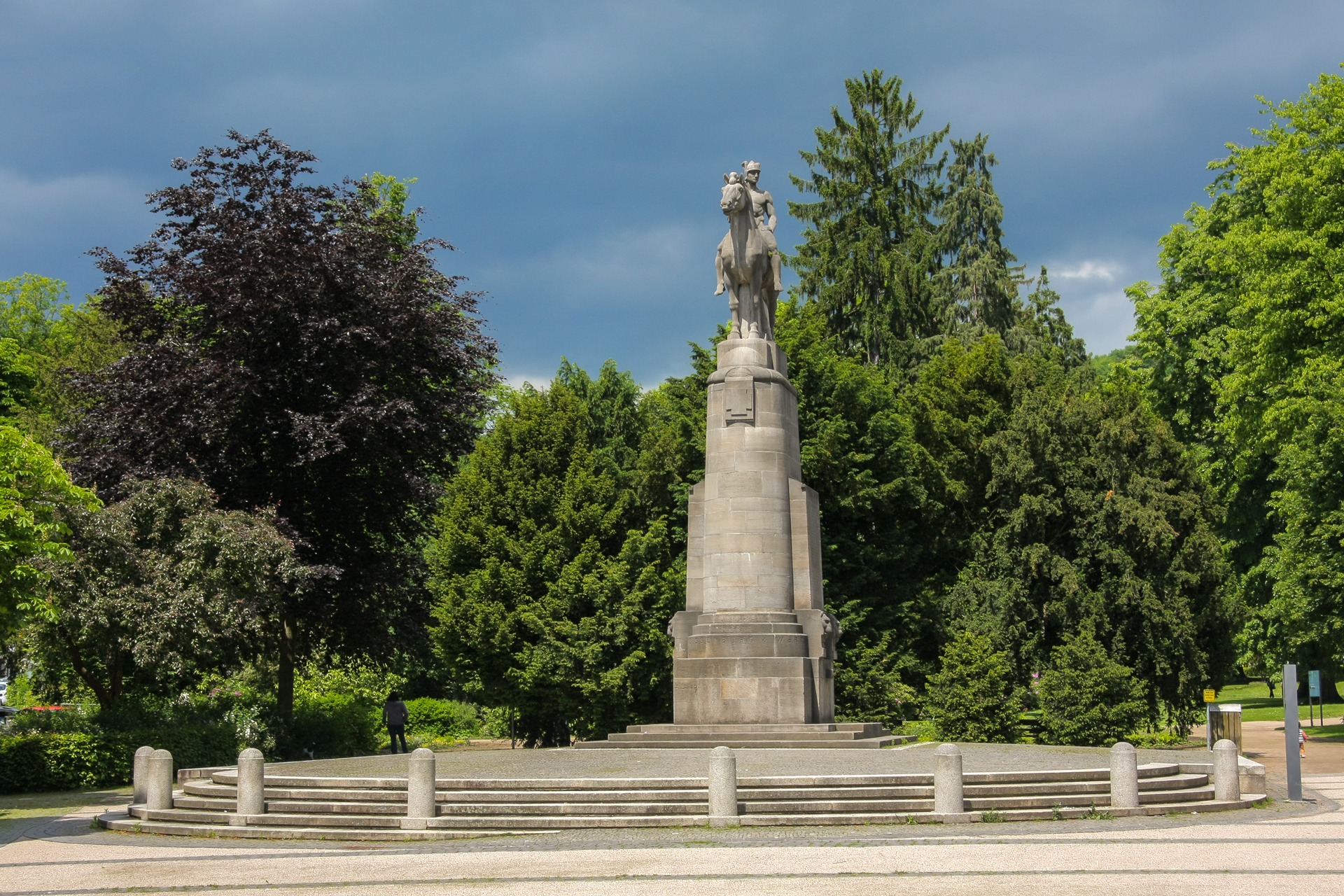
Kriegerdenkmal

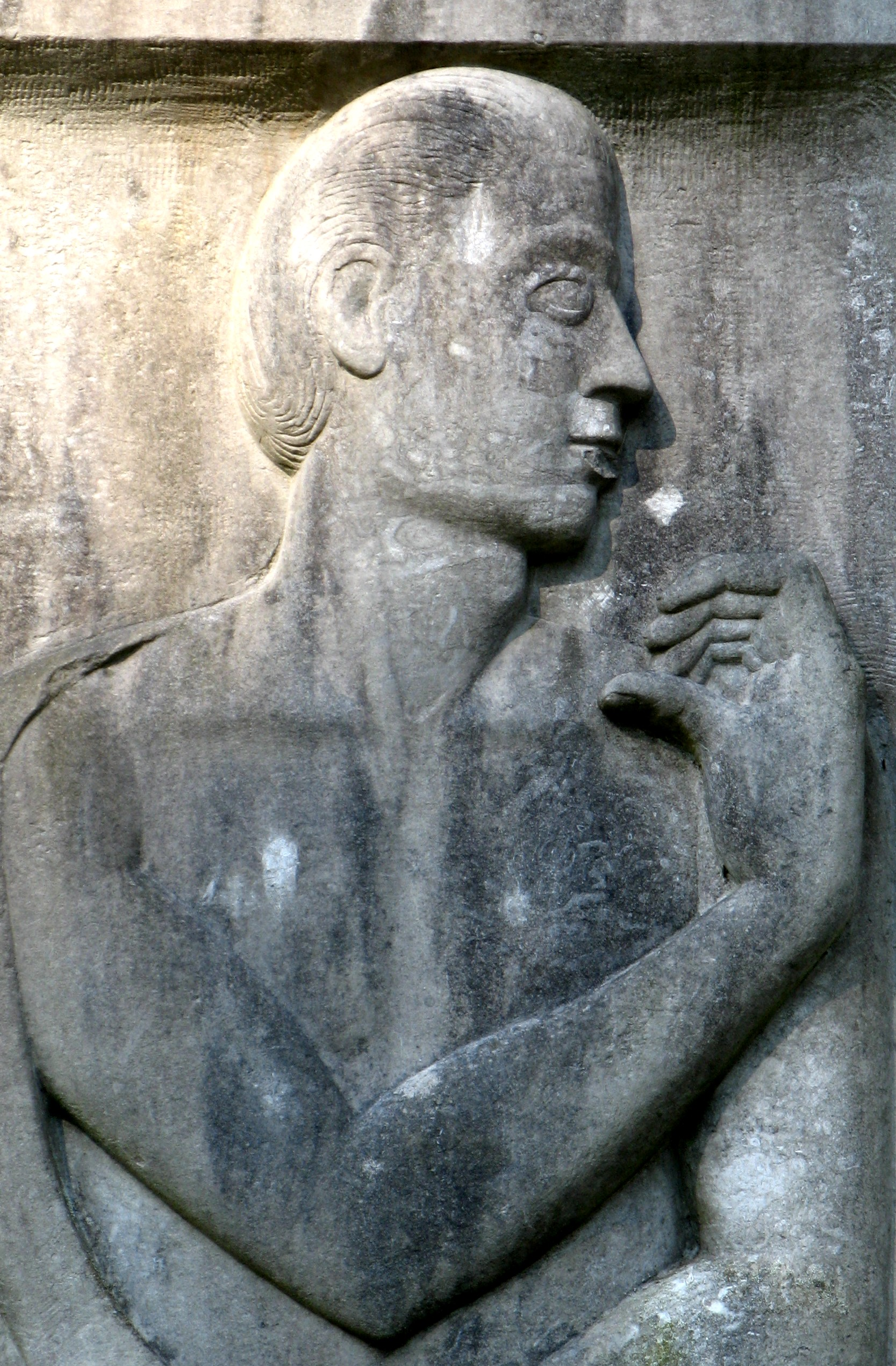
Bodenstedt monument

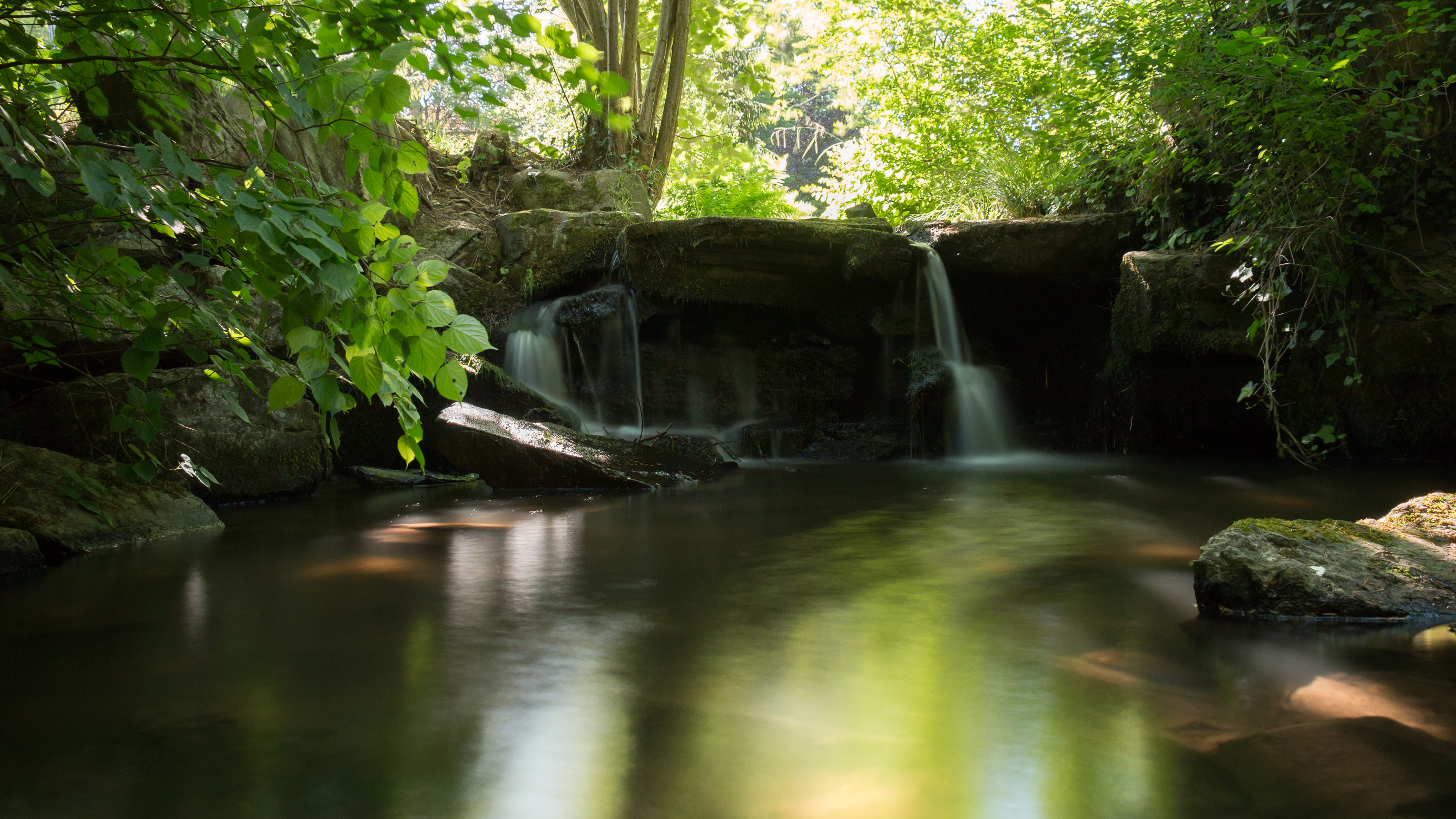
Schwarzbach

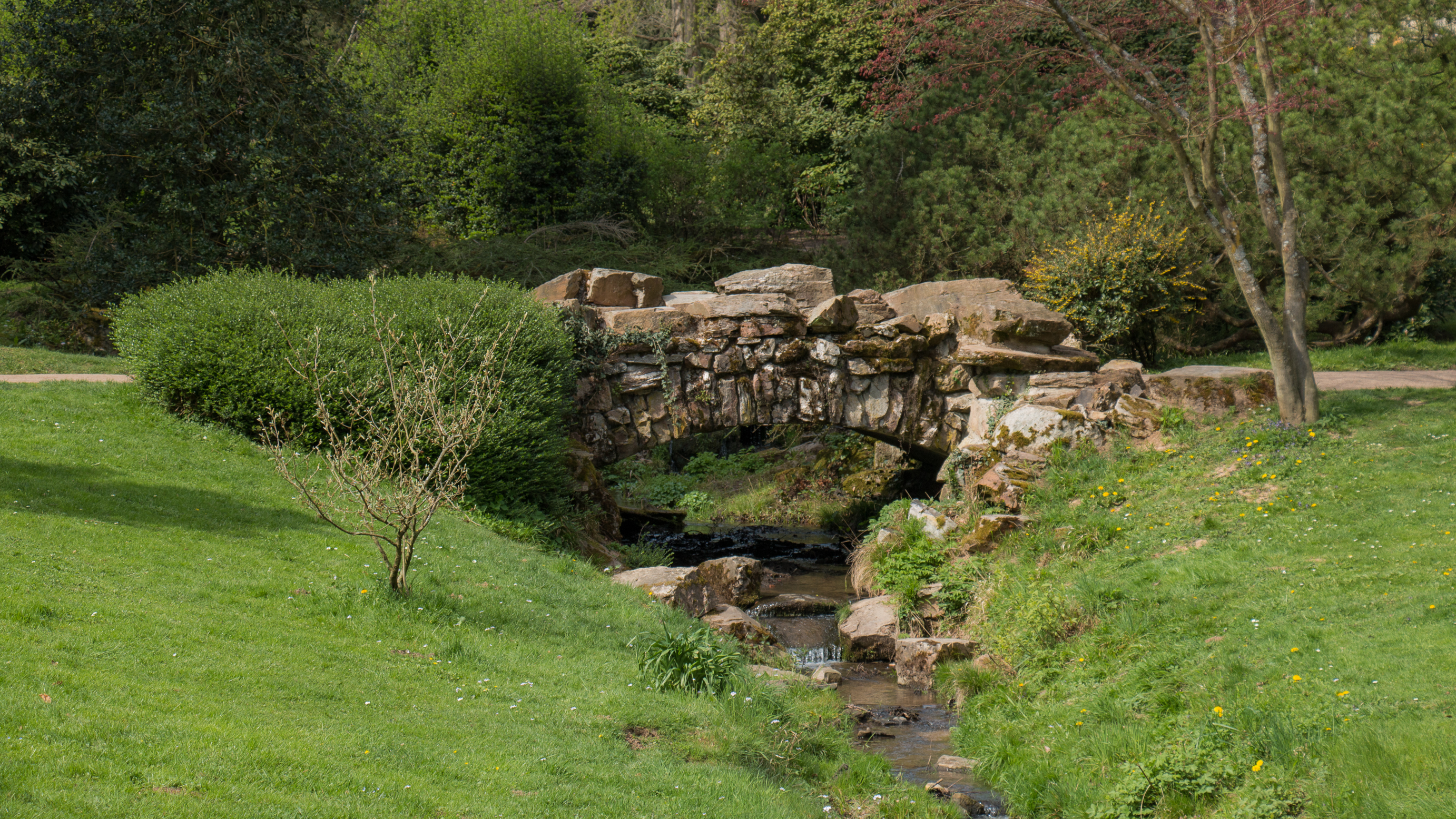
Stone bridge

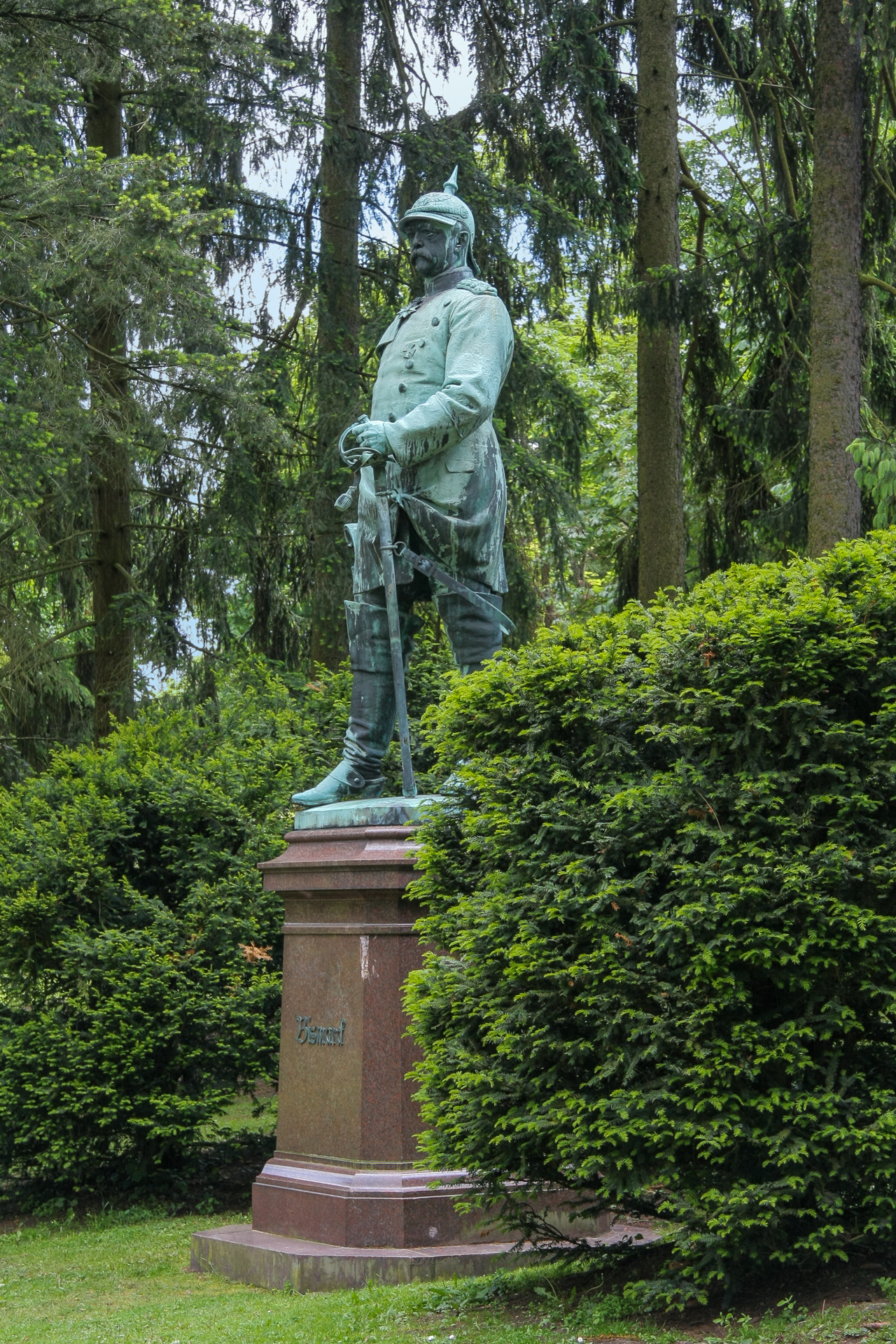
Bismarck monument
