= Neroberg =

German mountain

Coordinates: 50°05′55″N 8°13′50″E

Highest point
- Elevation: 245 m (804 ft)

Geography
- Location: Hesse, Germany

Neroberg is a hill in Wiesbaden in Hesse, Germany. It offers a panoramic view of the city and is therefore a tourist destination, reached by the historic Nerobergbahn, a funicular railway from the Nerotalanlagen.

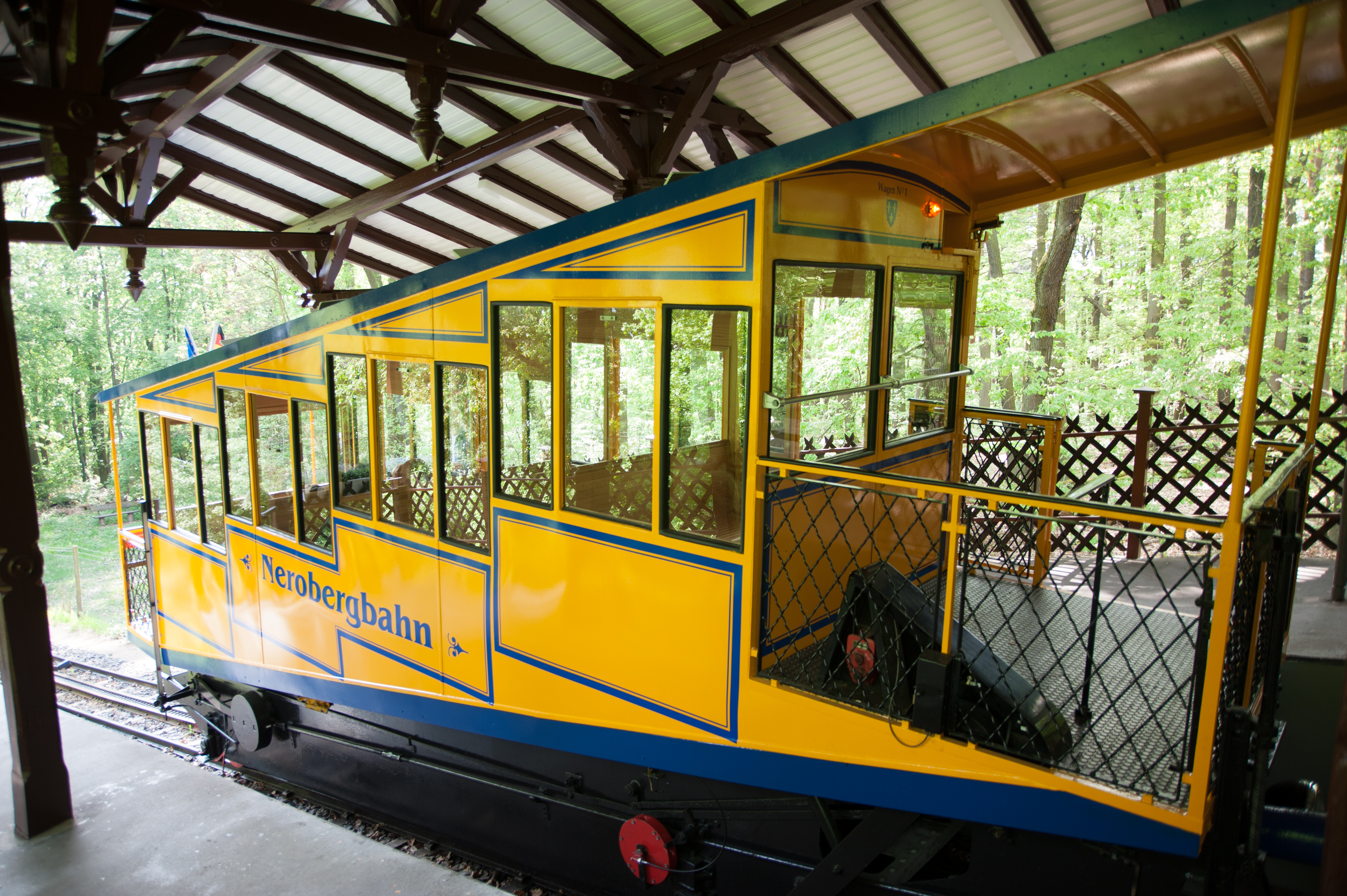
Nerobergbahn

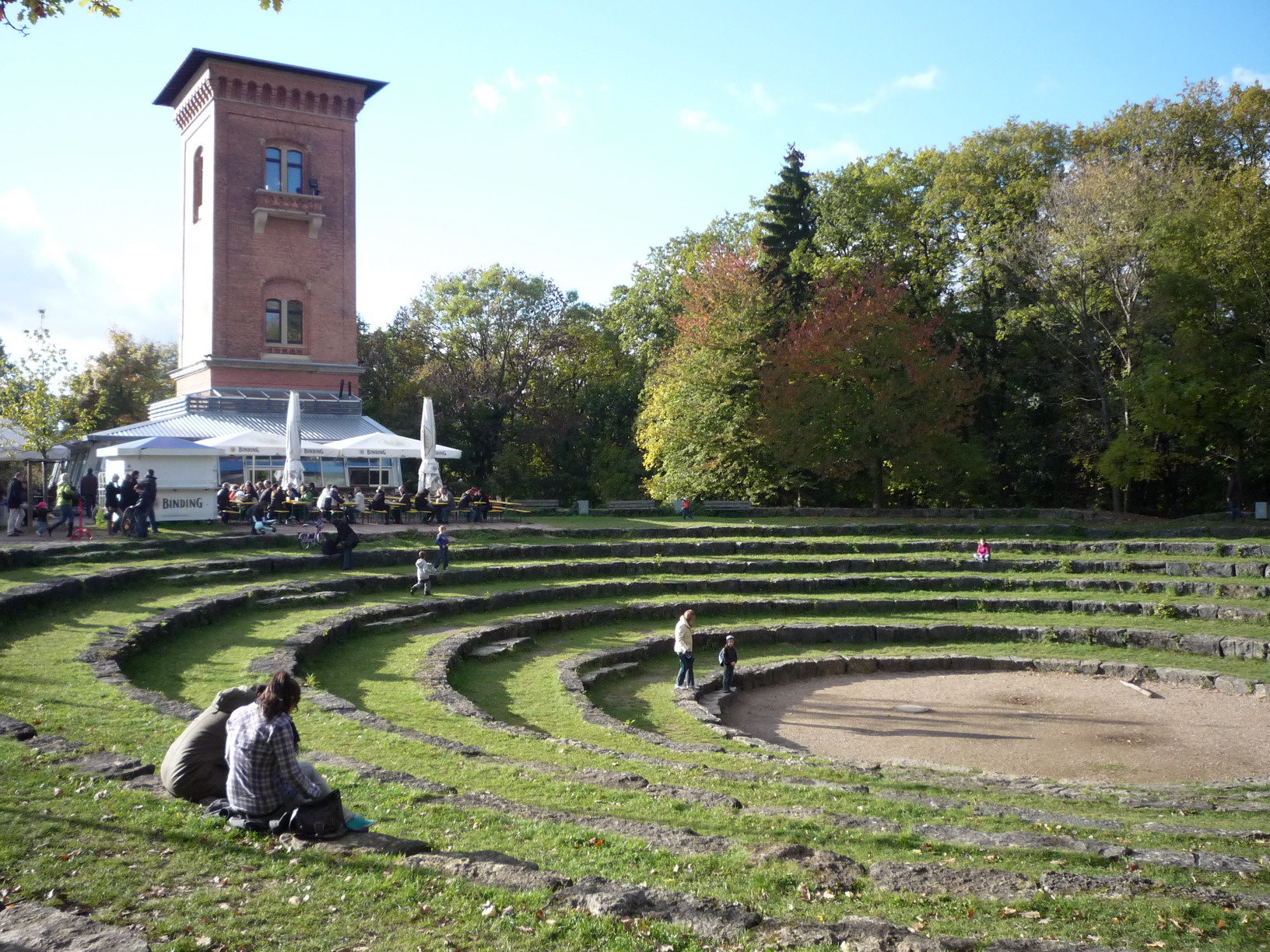
Tower of a former hotel

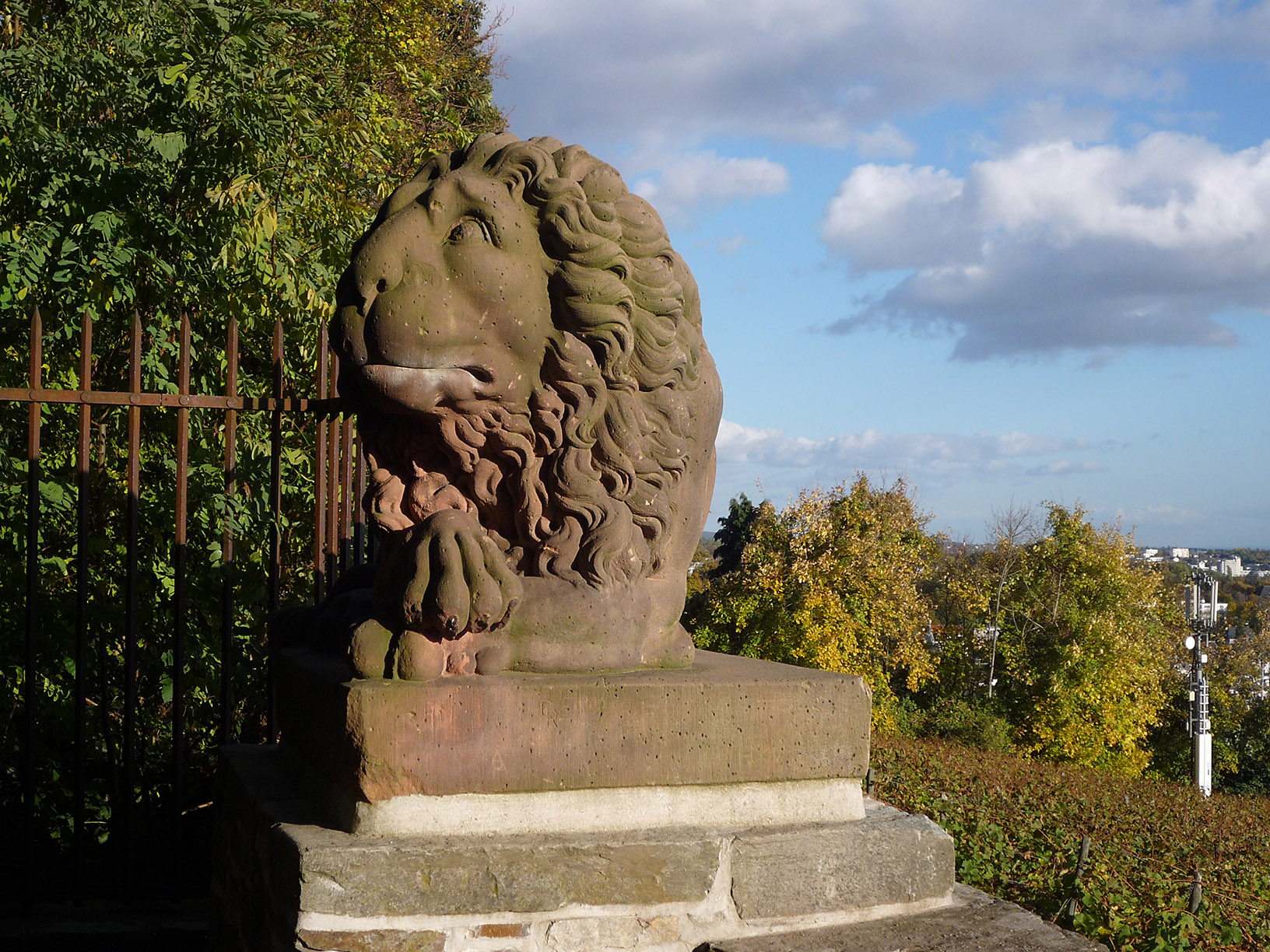
Lion on the viewing platform

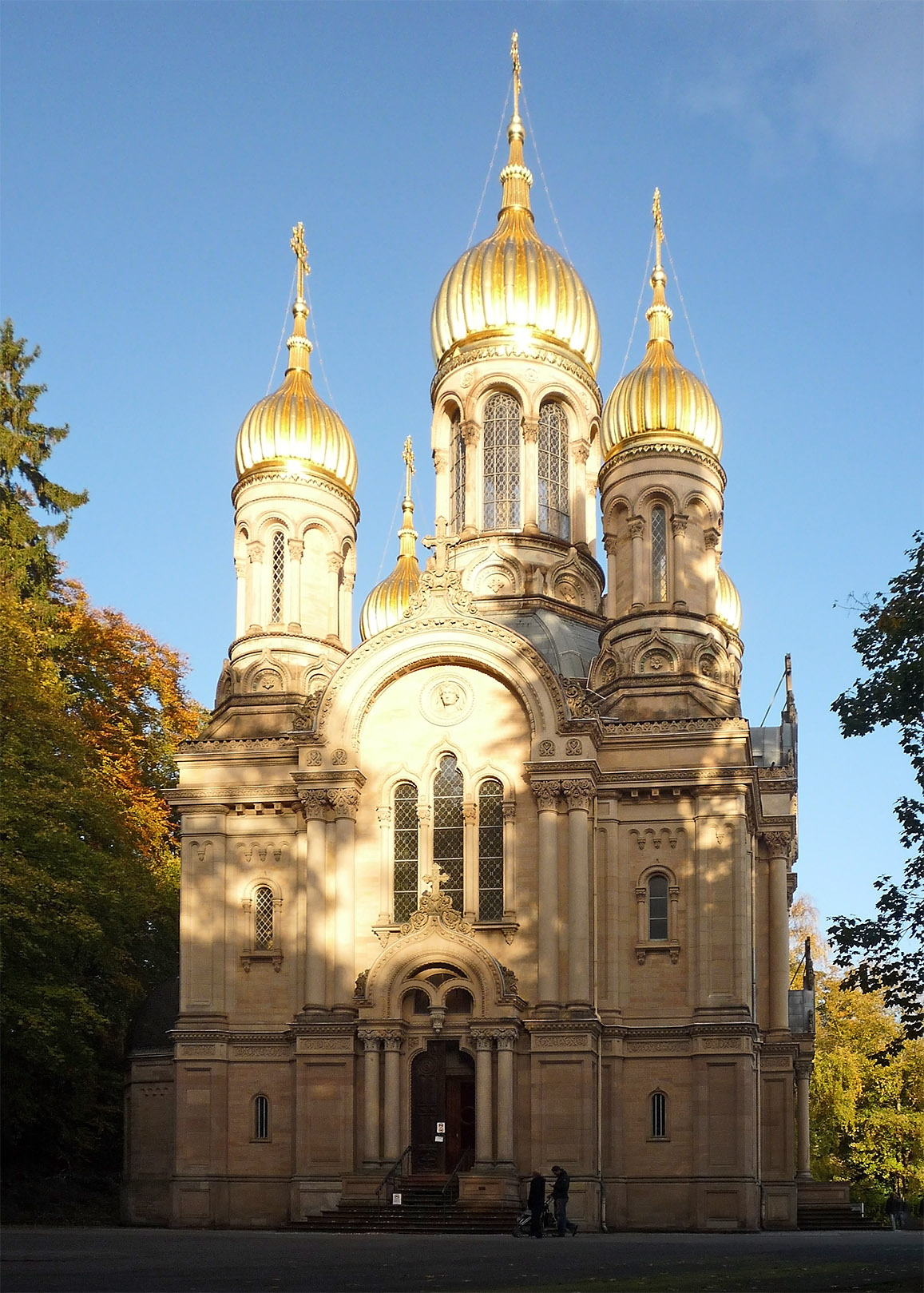
Griechische Kapelle

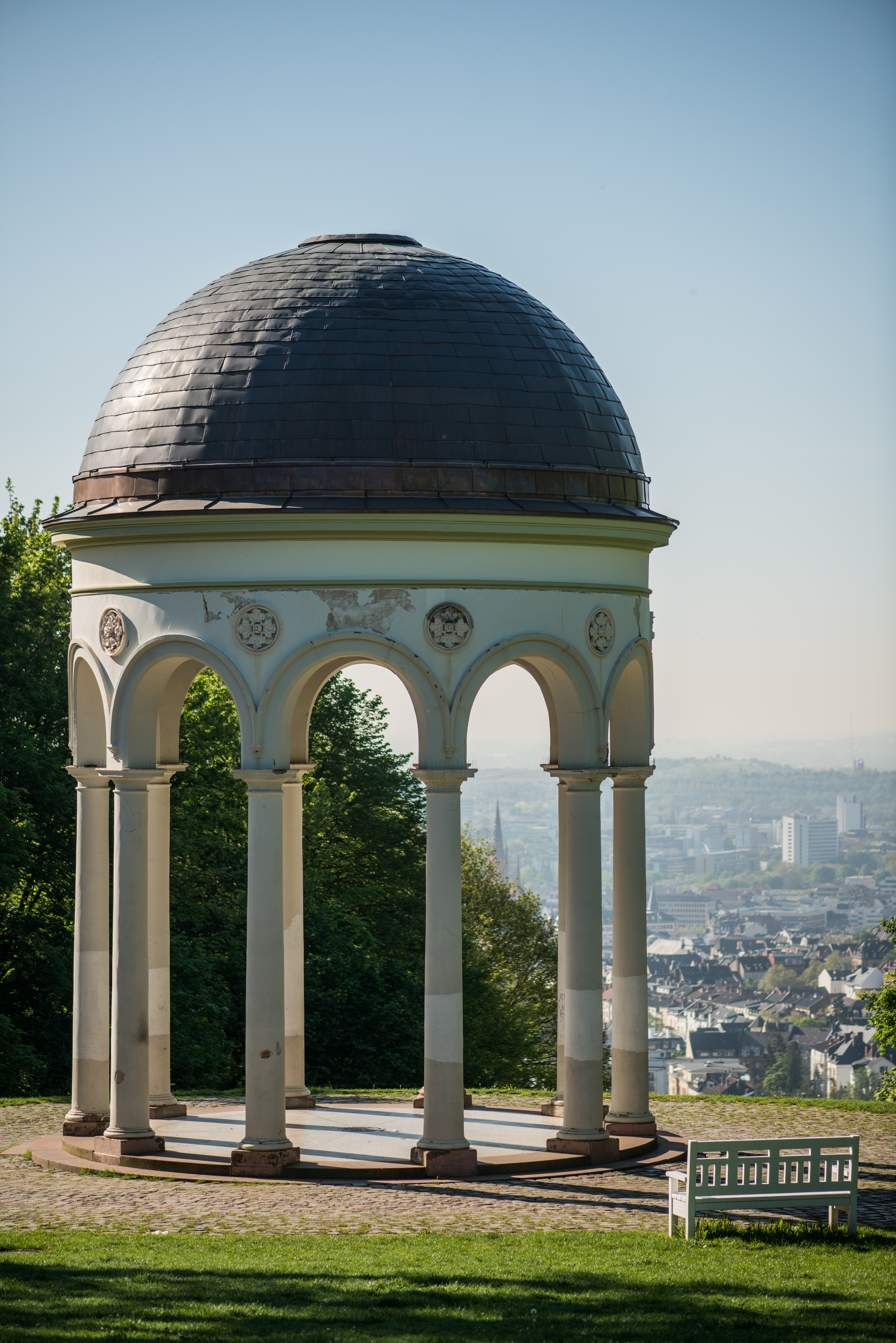
Monopteros
