= Nerobergbahn =

Funicular railway on Wiesbaden, Germany

Coordinates: 50°05′40.79″N 8°13′31.76″E

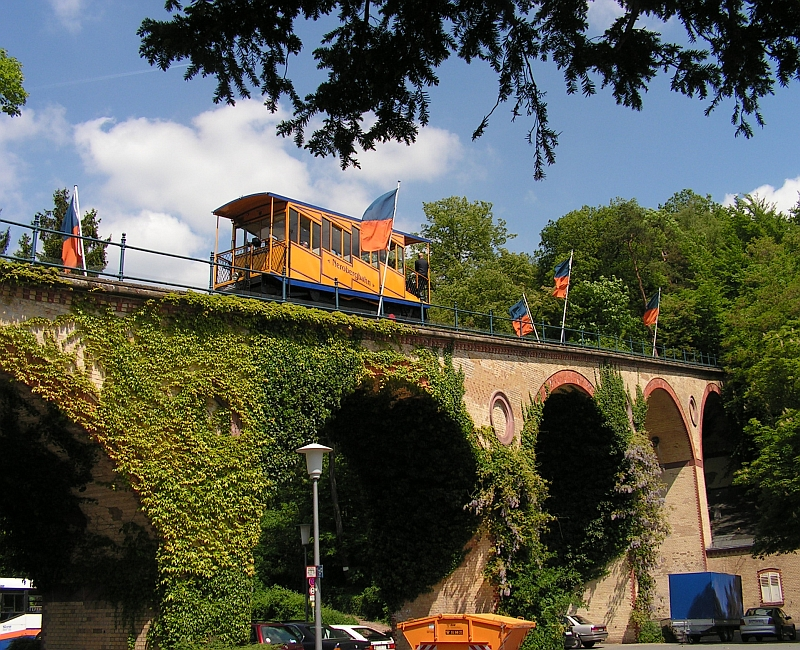
- The viaduct

Overview
- Owner: ESWE Verkehrsgesellschaft mbH
- Locale: Wiesbaden, Germany
- Stations: 2
- Website: www.eswe-verkehr.de/nerobergbahn.html

Service
- Type: funicular railway
- Rolling stock: 2 × 50-passenger cars

History
- Opened: 1888
- Closed: 1944
- Reopened: 1948

Technical
- Line length: 440 metres (1,444 ft)
- Number of tracks: 2, common centre rail
- Track gauge: 1,000 mm (3 ft 3 3/8 in) metre gauge
- Operating speed: 2 metres per second (6.6 ft/s)
- Highest elevation: 80 metres (262 ft)

The Nerobergbahn is a funicular railway in Wiesbaden, Germany. The line links the city, with a station at the north of the Nerotalanlagen, with the Neroberg hill to its north, which offers a panorama view.

== History ==
The line opened in 1888, and is one of the few funiculars employing water propulsion. At the upper station, tanks on the downhill car are filled with up to 7,000 litres (1,500 imp gal; 1,800 US gal) of water to ensure that it is heavier than the uphill car. The downhill car then pulls the uphill car uphill with a 452-metre (1,483 ft) long steel cable. When the downhill carriage arrives at the lower station, the water is discharged and pumped uphill.

In 1939, it was planned to convert the line to electric propulsion and to provide larger cars, but the outbreak of World War II prevented this. The line was taken out of service in 1944 due to war damage, and service was restarted in 1948. In 1988 the line was protected as a technical monument by the State of Hesse.

== Specifications ==
The funicular has the following technical parameters:

- Maximum gradient: 26%
- Average gradient: 19%
- Journey time: 3.5 minutes
- Traction: Water ballast

== See also ==
- List of funicular railways

== Bibliography ==
1. Kopp, Klaus (2000). 125 Jahre Wiesbadener Verkehrsbetriebe 1875-2000. Wiesbaden: ESWE-Verkehrsgesellschaft mbH. ISBN 9783980128827.
