= Telecom Telecommunication Tower Heidelberg =

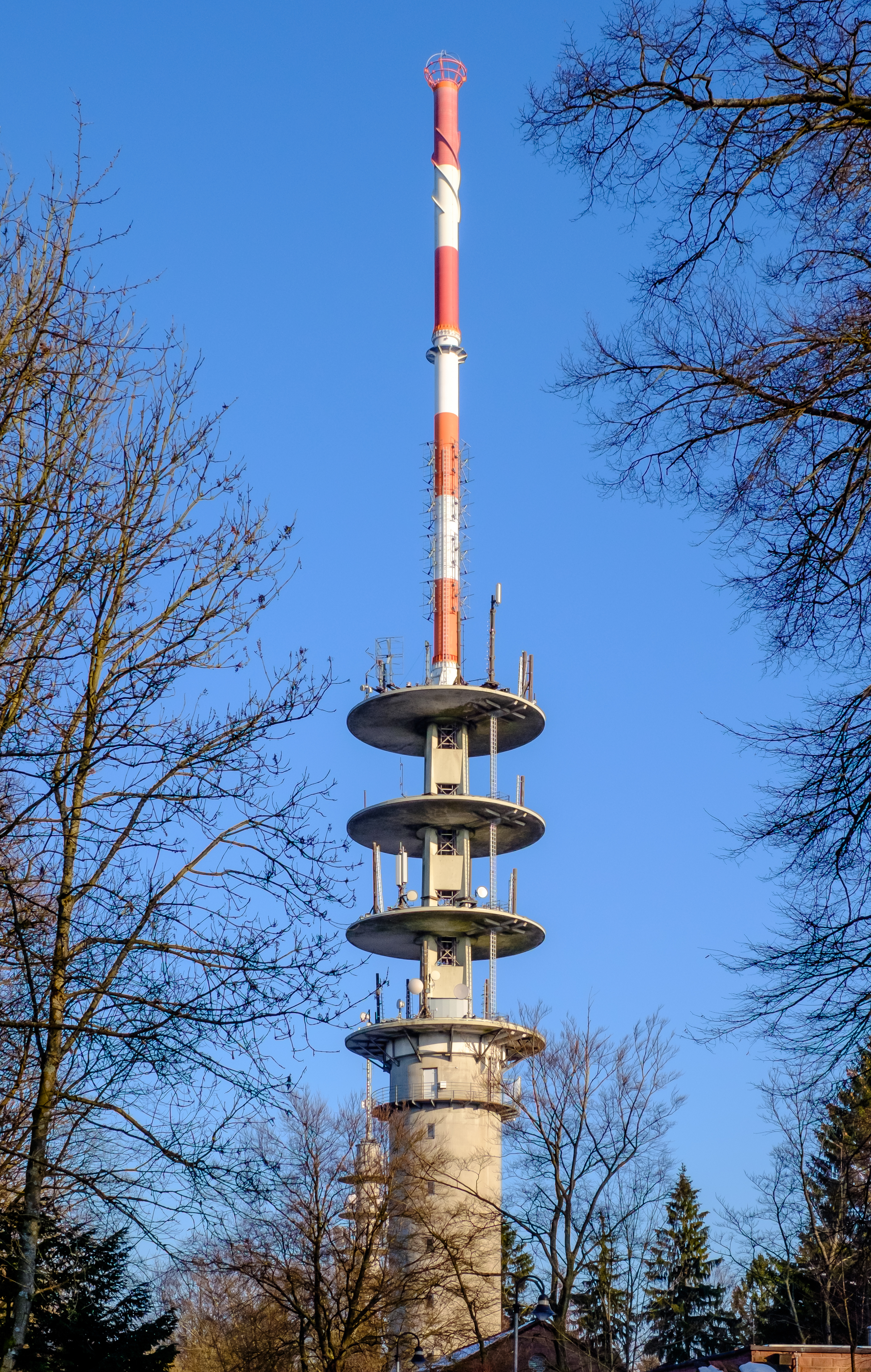
- Coordinates: 49°24′10″N 8°43′51″E
- Built: 1958

Telecom Telecommunication Tower Heidelberg (German: Fernmeldeturm Heidelberg) is a 102-meter-tall (335 ft) (originally 80 m, raised to 102 m in the 1980s) telecommunication tower built of reinforced concrete in the late 1950s on the mountain Königsstuhl near Heidelberg, Germany. Nearby are Fernsehturm Heidelberg and Telecommunication Tower of US-Forces Heidelberg. Like the other two towers, this structure has been converted from steel beams to reinforced concrete.

Only three analog FM radio channels are currently transmitted. Its main use is microwave communications for Deutsche Telekom also known as T-COM (t-home/t-mobile).

== See also ==
- List of towers
