= Evilard =

- Municipality
- Flag Coat of arms
- Location of Evilard
- Location within Switzerland Location within Canton of Bern
- Coordinates: 47°09′N 7°14′E
- Country: Switzerland
- Canton: Bern
- District: Biel/Bienne

Government
  - Executive: Gemeinderat with 5 members
  - Mayor: Gemeindepräsident; Madeleine Deckert (as of 2026)

Area
  - Total: 3.70 km^{2} (1.43 sq mi)
- Elevation: 697 m (2,287 ft)

Population (December 2020)
  - Total: 2,672
  - Density: 722/km^{2} (1,870/sq mi)
- Time zone: UTC+01:00 (CET)
  - Summer (DST): UTC+02:00 (CEST)
- Postal code: 2533
- SFOS number: 372
- ISO 3166 code: CH-BE
- Surrounded by: Biel/Bienne, Lamboing, Orvin, Tüscherz-Alfermée
- Website: www.evilard.ch

Evilard/Leubringen is a bilingual municipality in the Biel/Bienne administrative district of the canton of Bern, Switzerland. The French name of the municipality is Evilard and the German name is Leubringen.

The municipality contains two separate settlements, called in French Evilard and Macolin, in German Leubringen and Magglingen, and a rural area called in French the Pré de Macolin.

== History ==
Aerial view of Macolin/Magglingen (1950)

The first appearance of the municipality in written documents was in 1300, under the name of Lomeringen. French speakers are recorded later as using the names Evillard or es Villard ("in the town"). A number of monasteries and the Bishopric of Basel held land in this area during the Middle Ages. However, judicially and militarily the town was subordinate to the city of Biel. From 1798 to 1815, Evilard belonged to France and was part of the Canton de Bienne in the département of Mont-Terrible, which was joined with Haut-Rhin in 1800. At the Congress of Vienna in 1815, the town was returned to Switzerland and placed in the Canton of Bern. At first, Evilard was attached to the Oberamt Nidau; in 1832 it was placed in the Biel/Bienne district. At times, there has been debate over merging the administration with the city of Biel/Bienne; this was however rejected by the residents in 1902. Evilard is not an ecclesiastical parish. Until 1821 it was part of the church parish of Orvin, and since is combined with Biel/Bienne.

== Geography ==
Evilard lies 697 meters (2,287 ft) above sea level, and 1 kilometer (0.62 mi) north of the district capital city, Biel/Bienne, as the crow flies. The town spans a southeast-facing clearing of the front of the Jura Mountains, about 300 m (980 ft) over the city of Biel. In clear weather, the view from Evilard of the Swiss Plateau and the Alps from Mont Blanc to the region of Glärnisch and Alpstein is quite impressive.

The municipality reaches to the height of the anticline of Montagen de Macolin. It includes the town of Evilard, which is surrounded by Malvaux (German: Malewagwald, up to 765 m (2,510 ft) altitude). To the southwest, the municipality reaches in a narrow strip over the Magglingen to the peak of the Magglingerberg, up to the municipal high point of 1,070 m (3,510 ft).

It consists of the villages of Evilard and Macolin and the Pré de Macolin area. Macolin (German: Magglingen), lies at 875 m (2,871 ft) on the southeast slope of Magglingerberg. The neighboring municipalities are Biel/Bienne, Orvin, Lamboing, and Twann-Tüscherz.

Evilard has an area of 3.7 km^{2} (1.43 sq mi). Of this area, 1.1 km^{2} (0.42 mi^{2}) or 29.9% is used for agricultural purposes, while 1.47 km^{2} (0.57 mi^{2}) or 39.9% is forested. Of the rest of the land, 1.07 km^{2} (0.41 mi^{2}) or 29.1% is settled (buildings or roads).

Of the built up area, housing and buildings made up 19.6% and transportation infrastructure made up 4.6%. Power and water infrastructure as well as other special developed areas made up 1.1% of the area while parks, green belts and sports fields made up 3.8%. Out of the forested land, 38.6% of the total land area is heavily forested and 1.4% is covered with orchards or small clusters of trees. Of the agricultural land, 6.5% is used for growing crops and 23.1% is pastures.

On 31 December 2009 Amtsbezirk Biel, the municipality's former district, was dissolved. On the following day, 1 January 2010, it joined the newly created Verwaltungskreis Biel/Bienne.

== Coat of arms ==
The blazon of the municipal coat of arms is Or a Bull's Head caboshed Sable.

== Demographics ==
Evilard has a population (as of December 2020) of 2,672. As of 2010, 10.7% of the population are resident foreign nationals. Over the last 10 years (2000–2010) the population has changed at a rate of 1.3%. Migration accounted for 2.4%, while births and deaths accounted for -1.2%.

Most of the population (as of 2000) speaks German (1,426 or 60.0%) as their first language, French is the second most common (811 or 34.1%) and Italian is the third (35 or 1.5%). There are 2 people who speak Romansh.

As of 2008, the population was 48.7% male and 51.3% female. The population was made up of 1,028 Swiss men (43.4% of the population) and 126 (5.3%) non-Swiss men. There were 1,090 Swiss women (46.0%) and 12 (0.5%) non-Swiss women. Of the population in the municipality, 368 or about 15.5% were born in Evilard and lived there in 2000. There were 904 or 38.0% who were born in the same canton, while 661 or 27.8% were born somewhere else in Switzerland, and 375 or 15.8% were born outside of Switzerland.

As of 2010, children and teenagers (0–19 years old) make up 21% of the population, while adults (20–64 years old) make up 55.3% and seniors (over 64 years old) make up 23.7%.

As of 2000, there were 852 people who were single and never married in the municipality. There were 1,251 married individuals, 161 widows or widowers and 112 individuals who are divorced.

As of 2000, there were 294 households that consist of only one person and 68 households with five or more people. In 2000, a total of 967 apartments (90.3% of the total) were permanently occupied, while 70 apartments (6.5%) were seasonally occupied and 34 apartments (3.2%) were empty. As of 2010, the construction rate of new housing units was 11.8 new units per 1000 residents. The vacancy rate for the municipality, in 2011, was 1.5%.

The historical population is given in the following chart:

== Politics ==
In the 2011 federal election the most popular party was the SPS which received 21.6% of the vote. The next three most popular parties were the SVP (18.7%), the FDP (16.8%) and the BDP Party (11.9%). In the federal election, a total of 845 votes were cast, and the voter turnout was 47.7%.

== Economy ==
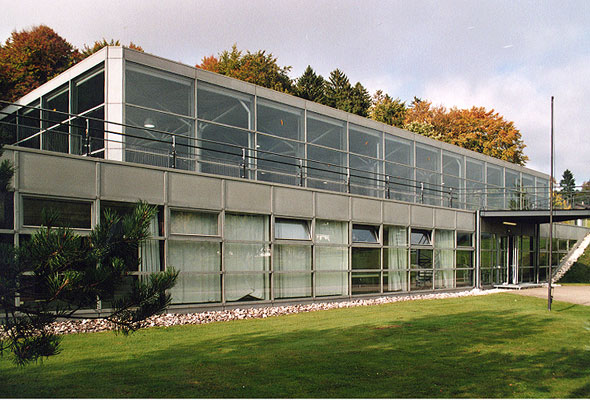
Jubilee Hall High School in Macolin

Evilard was dominated by agriculture until the beginning of the 20th century. Since about 1950, the town has built a large number of single-family homes for commuters working in Biel/Bienne. Macolin has developed into a resort location starting in about 1875, thanks to its sunny high altitude. Today the town has many tourist facilities, and includes the Swiss Federal Office of Sport (FOSPO), the Swiss federal government’s centre for expertise in sports.

As of 2011, Evilard had an unemployment rate of 1.74%. As of 2008, there were a total of 276 people employed in the municipality. Of these, there were 29 people employed in the primary economic sector and about 8 businesses involved in this sector. 23 people were employed in the secondary sector and there were 9 businesses in this sector. 224 people were employed in the tertiary sector, with 43 businesses in this sector.

In 2008 there were a total of 197 full-time equivalent jobs. The number of jobs in the primary sector was 20, all of which were in agriculture. The number of jobs in the secondary sector was 22 of which 7 or (31.8%) were in manufacturing and 10 (45.5%) were in construction. The number of jobs in the tertiary sector was 155. In the tertiary sector; 25 or 16.1% were in wholesale or retail sales or the repair of motor vehicles, 20 or 12.9% were in the movement and storage of goods, 13 or 8.4% were in a hotel or restaurant, 2 or 1.3% were in the information industry, 17 or 11.0% were technical professionals or scientists, 27 or 17.4% were in education and 35 or 22.6% were in health care.

In 2000, there were 339 workers who commuted into the municipality and 891 workers who commuted away. The municipality is a net exporter of workers, with about 2.6 workers leaving the municipality for every one entering. Of the working population, 24% used public transportation to get to work, and 57.9% used a private car.

== Religion ==
From the 2000 census, 532 or 22.4% were Roman Catholic, while 1,219 or 51.3% belonged to the Swiss Reformed Church. Of the rest of the population, there were 15 members of an Orthodox church (or about 0.63% of the population), there were 5 individuals (or about 0.21% of the population) who belonged to the Christian Catholic Church, and there were 166 individuals (or about 6.99% of the population) who belonged to another Christian church. There were 4 individuals (or about 0.17% of the population) who were Jewish, and 26 (or about 1.09% of the population) who were Islamic. There were 5 individuals who were Buddhist, 4 individuals who were Hindu and 3 individuals who belonged to another church. 388 (or about 16.33% of the population) belonged to no church, are agnostic or atheist, and 90 individuals (or about 3.79% of the population) did not answer the question.

== Education ==
In Evilard about 942 or (39.6%) of the population have completed non-mandatory upper secondary education, and 586 or (24.7%) have completed additional higher education (either university or a Fachhochschule). Of the 586 who completed tertiary schooling, 63.1% were Swiss men, 24.6% were Swiss women, 7.5% were non-Swiss men and 4.8% were non-Swiss women.

The Canton of Bern school system provides one year of non-obligatory Kindergarten, followed by six years of Primary school. This is followed by three years of obligatory lower Secondary school where the students are separated according to ability and aptitude. Following the lower Secondary students may attend additional schooling or they may enter an apprenticeship.

During the 2009-10 school year, there were a total of 241 students attending classes in Evilard. There were 2 kindergarten classes with a total of 36 students in the municipality. Of the kindergarten students, 8.3% were permanent or temporary residents of Switzerland (not citizens) and 13.9% have a different mother language than the classroom language. The municipality had 4 primary classes and 89 students. Of the primary students, 2.2% were permanent or temporary residents of Switzerland (not citizens) and 4.5% have a different mother language than the classroom language.

As of 2000, there were 11 students in Evilard who came from another municipality, while 206 residents attended schools outside the municipality.

== Transport ==
Transport within the municipality is well-developed. It is linked with Biel/Bienne and Orvin by road. In 1898 the Bienne–Evilard Funicular between Biel/Bienne and Evilard was opened. Magglingen is also connected to Biel/Bienne by the Biel–Magglingen Funicular.

== Personalities ==
- Willy Burkhard (1900–1955), composer
- Henri Dubuis (1906–2003), architect
- Valérie Favre (born 1959), artist
