= Verkehrsbetriebe Biel/Transports publics biennois =

Company

Verkehrsbetriebe Biel Transports publics biennois

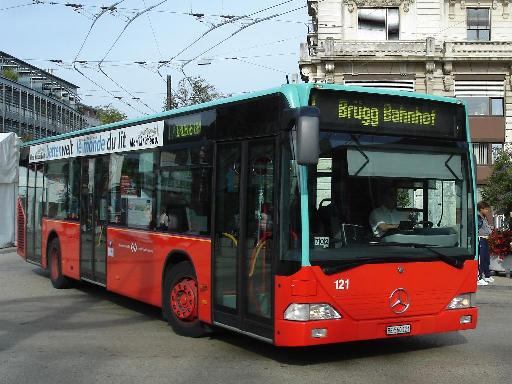
- Industry: Transport
- Headquarters: Biel/Bienne, Switzerland
- Area served: Biel/Bienne

The Verkehrsbetriebe Biel (in German) or Transports publics biennois (in French) is a public transport operator in and around the bilingual city of Biel/Bienne, in the Swiss canton of Bern. It operates the city's network of trolleybuses, motor buses, and funicular railways. It is also known by its respective initials as VB/Tpb.

== History ==
From 1877, Biel/Bienne was served by horse-drawn trams, operated by the Compagnie générale des tramways suisses of Geneva. In 1901, the City of Biel/Bienne took over operations and, over the following two years, converted the system to electric operation. The city's first buses operated in 1926, and the first trolleybuses in 1940. The last trams operated in 1948, when route 1 was converted to trolleybus operation.

In 2001, VB/Tpb was created as an independent company owned by the city. In 2014, it also took over the town's two funicular railways:

- Biel/Bienne–Leubringen/Evilard
- Biel/Bienne–Magglingen/Macolin

== Operation ==
The company operates two trolleybus lines, 11 motorbus lines and two funicular lines, with a total length of 175 kilometres (109 mi). Its fleet includes over 60 vehicles and it has 253 employees. It transports over 50,000 passengers per day.

== See also ==
- Trams in Biel/Bienne
- Trolleybuses in Biel/Bienne
- Transport in Switzerland
- List of bus operating companies in Switzerland
