= Valérie Favre =

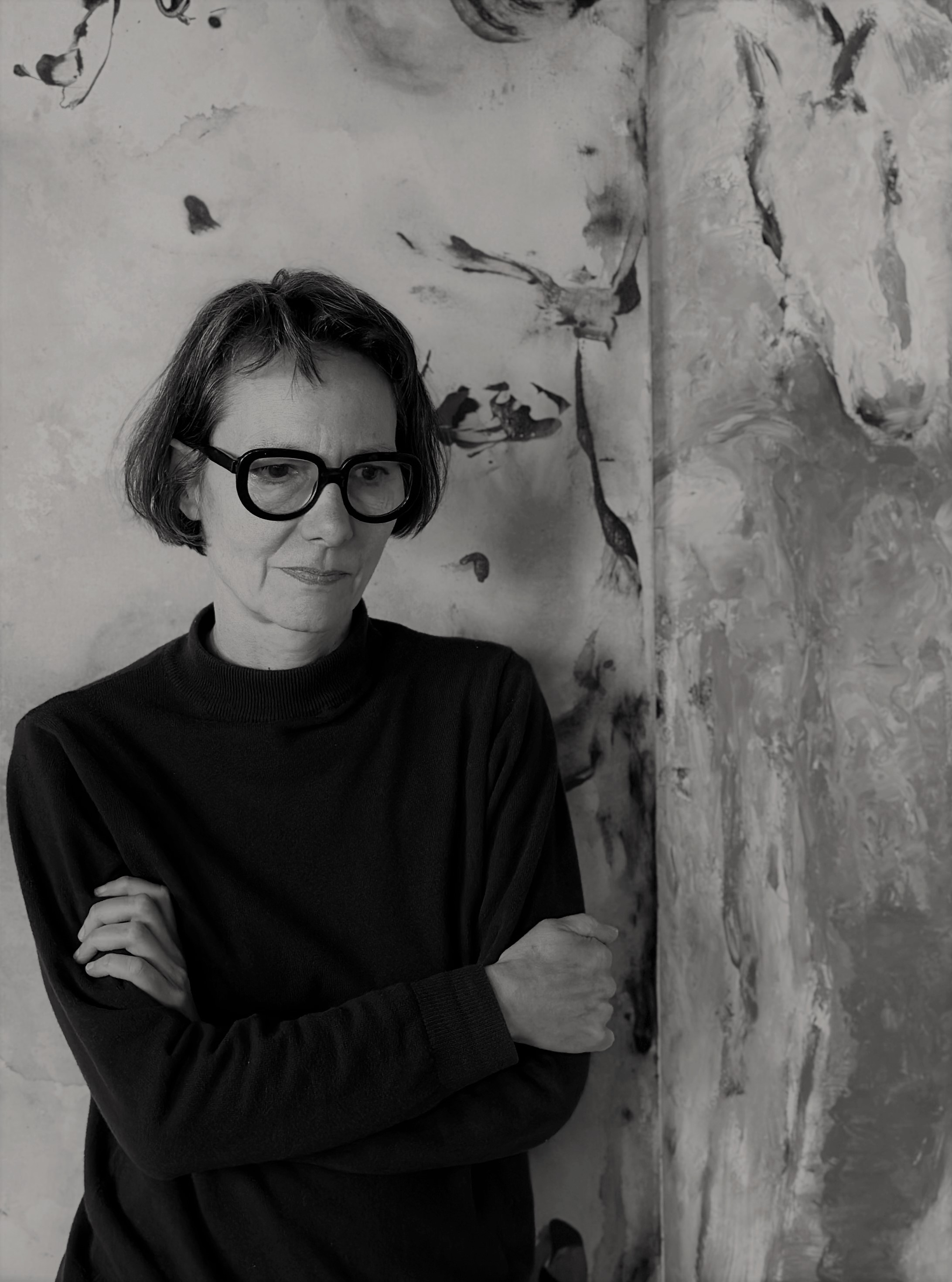
- Born: 1959 (age 66–67); Evilard, Switzerland
- Known for: Painting
- Website: www.valeriefavre.net

Valérie Favre (born 1959) is a Swiss artist who has been a professor of painting at the Universität der Künste in Berlin since 2006.

== Biography ==
Born in Evilard, Switzerland, Favre grew up in the canton of Bern. Having worked as a stage designer and actress at the theater in Paris in the early 1980s, she developed an interest in painting. After 18 years in France, she relocated to Berlin in 1998.

== History of works 1989–2010 ==
During her career, Favre's works have grown in a series of interconnected cycles, showing references to different fields of art history, geopolicy, philosophy, theater and film as well as her interest in narration in general.

- 1989-1990 "Périmètre" paintings
- 1991-1994 White Paintings
- 1992-1994 Creation of objects
- 1994-1996 "Robe Rouge", first sound work from the series Balls and Tunnels
- 1996-1997 Works after Pontormo, Velázquez, Watteau, Géricault
- 1998 "Filets a souvenirs"
- 1999 "Les soeurs malades", beginning of the series Lapine Univers
- 2000 Series of Intérieurs, Petite filles
- 2001 Series of Excercices de vols
- 2002-2004 "Autos dans la nuit", from the series Forêt; beginning of ongoing suicide series, beginning of series Idiotinnen
- 2005-2007 "Bruder Grimm" and "Columbia Variations", beginning of the Shortcuts series
- 2008 "Kakerlaken", "Autoscooter", "Redescription"
- 2008-2011 Volière and Stage Series

== Exhibitions history ==
Favre's work has been exhibited internationally in museums such as K21, Düsseldorf, Germany (2010/2011); Kunstmuseum Lucerne, Switzerland (2009/2010); Carré d'Art Nîmes, France (2009); Centre Georges Pompidou Paris, France (2009); Haus am Waldsee, Berlin, Germany (2006); Westfälischer Kunstverein Münster, Germany (2004); Musée de Picardie Amiens, France (2003); FRAC Auvergne, France (1999). In 2024 she was the recipient of the Meret Oppenheim Prize in Basel.

Favre is represented by Galerie Barbara Thumm, Berlin; Galerie Jocelyn Wolff, Paris; Vielmetter, Los Angeles; and Galerie Peter Kilchmann, Zurich.

== Publications ==
- "Valérie Favre - Visions", exh. cat. Carré d'Art Nîmes, Kunstmuseum Luzern, texts by Beatrice von Bismarck, Claire Brunet, Jürgen Harten, Jaqueline Lichtenstein, Hatje Cantz, Ostfildern, 2009
- "Valérie Favre - Der dritte Bruder Grimm", exh. cat. Haus am Waldsee, texts by Katja Blomberg, Alexander Koch, Revolver, Frankfurt, 2006
- "Valérie Favre - Mise en Scène", exh. cat. Westfälischer Kunstverein Münster, texts by Valérie Favre, Carina Plath, Gregor Jansen, Verlag für moderne Kunst Nürnberg, Nürnberg, 2004
- "Valérie Favre - Forêts", exh. cat. Musée de Picardie, texts by Sylvie Couderc, Kerstin Grübmeyer, Amiens, 2003
- "Valérie Favre - Sophie et Patrick", exh. cat. L'Espal, Centre Culturel, text by Marion Casanova, Le Mans, 2001
- "Range ta Chambre", exh. cat. Centre d'Art Contemporain de Basse Normandie, Herouville Saint-Clair, 1994
