= Trolleybuses in Biel/Bienne =

Transit system in Bern, Switzerland

Biel/Bienne trolleybus system
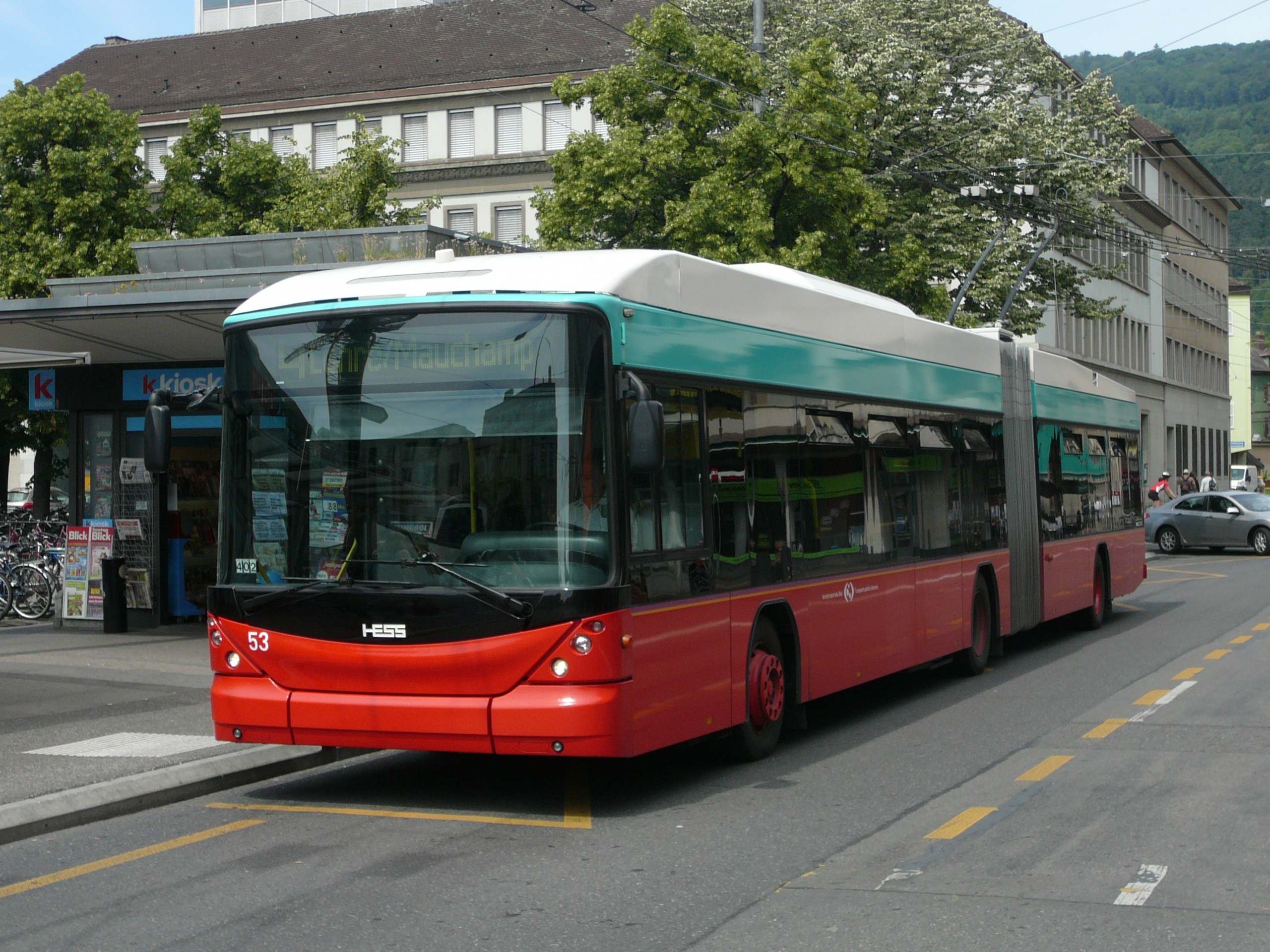
- A Swisstrolley articulated trolleybus in Biel/Bienne

Operation
- Locale: Biel/Bienne, Switzerland
- Open: 1940
- Status: Open
- Routes: 2
- Operator: Verkehrsbetriebe Biel/Transports publics biennois (VB/TPB)

Statistics
Overview
- Website: http://www.vb-tpb.ch VB/TPB (in German and French)

The Biel/Bienne trolleybus system (German: Trolleybus System Biel; French: Réseau trolleybus de Bienne) is part of the public transport network of the bilingual city of Biel/Bienne, in the canton of Bern, Switzerland. The system also serves the neighbouring municipality of Nidau.

Opened on 19 October 1940, the system gradually replaced the Biel/Bienne tramway network.

== Lines ==
The present system is made up of the following lines:

| Line 1 | Eisbahn/Patinoire – Zentralplatz/Place Central – Bahnhof/Gare – Orpundplatz – Vorhölzli/Bois-Devant |
| Line 4 | Löhre/Mauchamp – Orpundplatz – Zentralplatz/Place Central – Bahnhof/Gare – Nidau, Bahnhof/Gare |

== Fleet ==
| Numbers | Quantity | Manufacturer | Electrical equipment | Model | Year built |
|---|---|---|---|---|---|
| 81–90 | 10 | NAW / Hess | Kiepe | BGT-N2 | 1997 |
| 51–60 | 10 | Hess | Kiepe | BGT-N2C | 2008 |

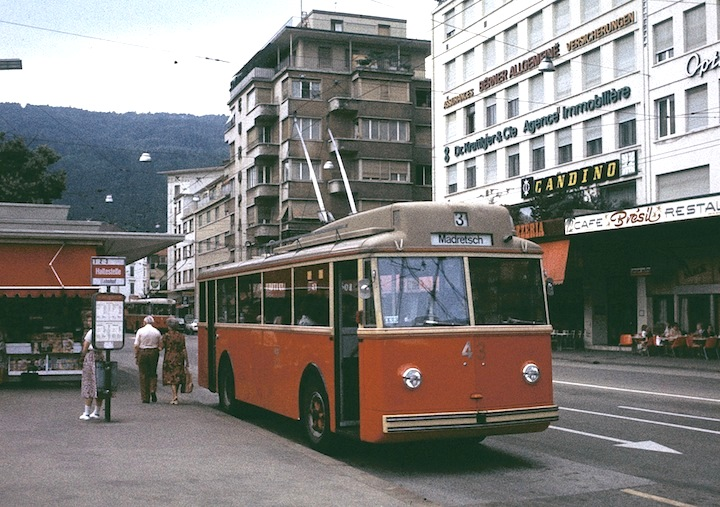
Berna trolleybus 43 from 1951, on Line 3 in 1979

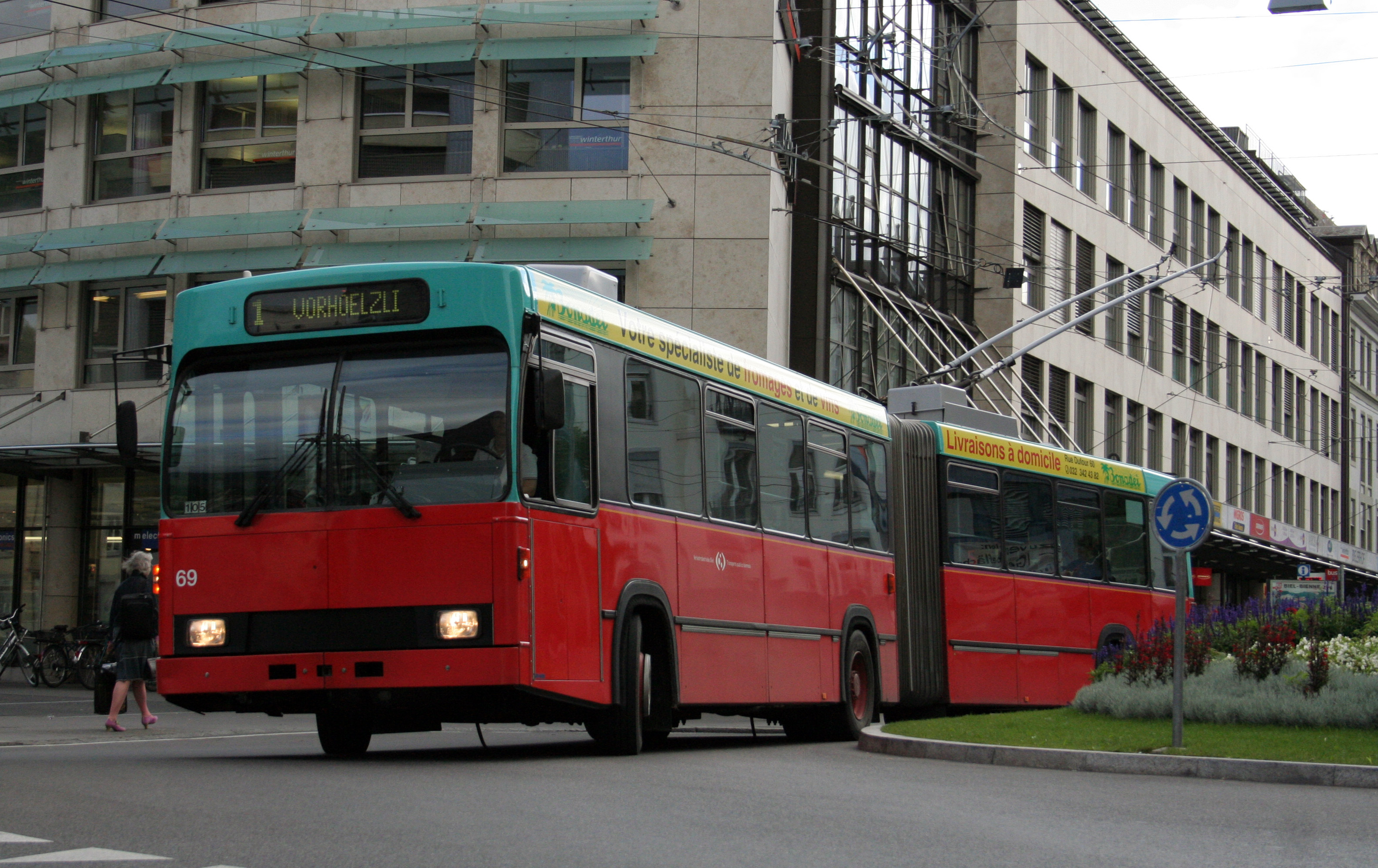
Volvo-articulated trolleybus No. 69 from 1988, on line 1 in 2007

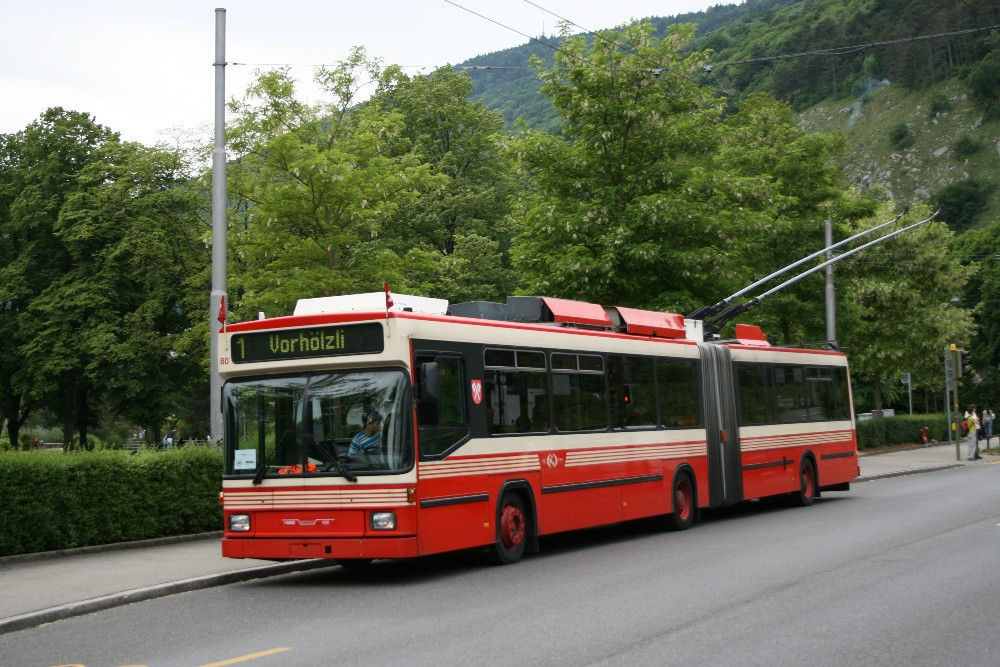
The Swisstrolley prototype No. 80 (since sold), in Biel/Bienne in 2008

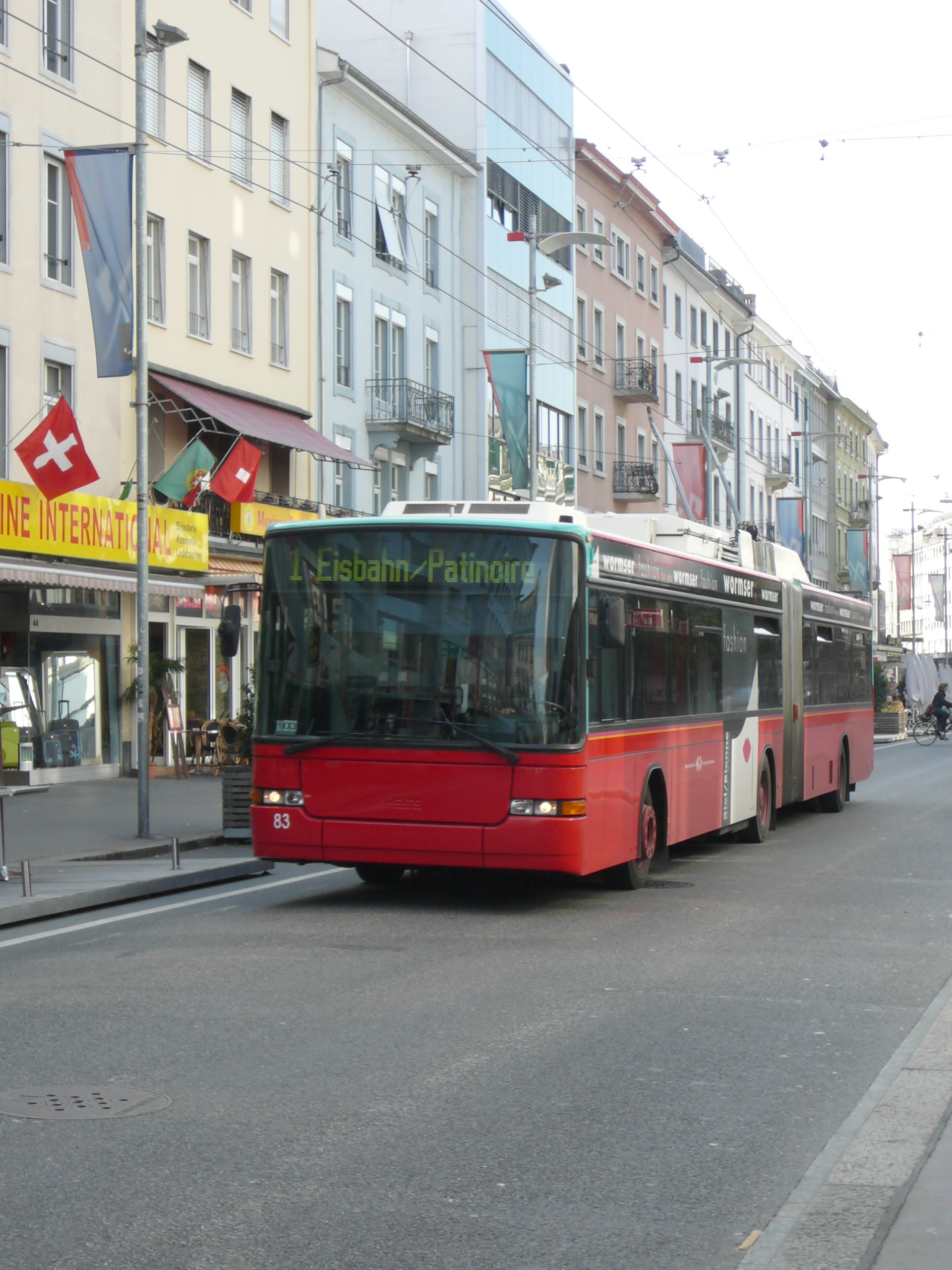
A Swisstrolley 2 from 1997

== See also ==
- List of trolleybus systems in Switzerland
