= Bienne–Evilard Funicular =

Funicular railway in canton of Bern, Switzerland

Coordinates: 47°08′46″N 07°14′32″E

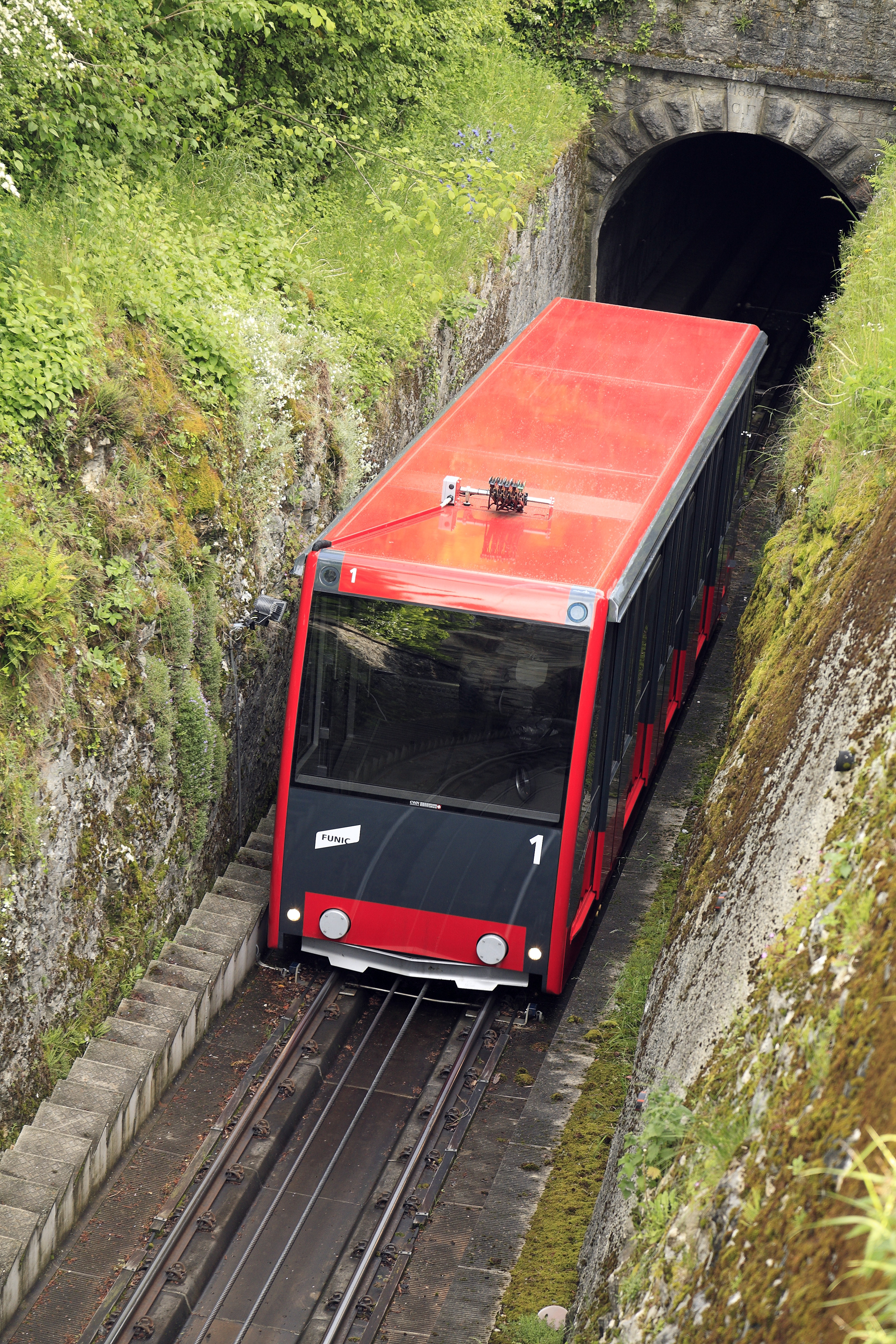
- Funicular car in 2012

Overview
- Other name(s): Leubringenbahn; Funiculaire Bienne–Evilard; Drahtseilbahn Biel-Leubringen; Seilbahn Biel-Leubringen
- Status: In operation
- Owner: Verkehrsbetriebe Biel/Transports publics biennois (VB/TPB)
- Locale: Biel/Bienne, Switzerland
- Termini: "Biel/Bienne Leubringenb.(Funi)"; "Evilard/Leubringen"
- Stations: 3 (including "Biel/Bienne Beaumont")

Service
- Type: Funicular
- Operator: Verkehrsbetriebe Biel/Transports publics biennois (VB/TPB)
- Rolling stock: 2

History
- Opened: January 1898 (128 years ago)
- Intermediate station: 1905

Technical
- Line length: 920 m (3,020 ft)
- Track length: 933 m (3,061 ft)
- Number of tracks: 1 with passing loop
- Track gauge: 1,000 mm (3 ft 3 3/8 in)
- Electrification: from opening
- Highest elevation: 694 m (2,277 ft)
- Maximum incline: 35.5%

The Bienne–Evilard Funicular (German:Leubringenbahn; French:Funiculaire Bienne–Evilard) is a funicular railway in the bilingual city of Biel/Bienne in the Swiss canton of Bern. The funicular links Biel/Bienne with Leubringen/Evilard in the Jura Mountains above the town. It is owned and operated by Verkehrsbetriebe Biel/Transports publics biennois (VB/TPB), the city's public transport operator.

== History ==
The company Drahtseilbahn Biel-Leubringen was formed in 1896, and the line was opened in January 1898. As built it was electrically operated, with single track and a central passing loop. In 1905, an intermediate station was built at the passing loop, with a roof over the platforms and tracks. In 1964, the company changed its name to Seilbahn Biel-Leubringen. In 2000, the owning company merged with the owners of the nearby Biel–Magglingen Funicular to form FUNIC AG. In 2003, the drive system was replaced, and in the summer of 2009, the new, modern panoramic cars were put into service. In 2014, FUNIC AG was acquired by the VB/TPB.

== Operation ==
The line has a length of 933 metres (3,061 ft), a maximum incline of 37%, overcomes a difference of elevation of 242 metres (794 ft) and reaches a maximum elevation of 694 metres (2,277 ft). It has a single metre gauge track with an intermediate passing loop. Besides the two terminal stations, it also serves an intermediate station, known as Beaumont, at the passing loop. Cars run at a maximum speed of 5 metres per second (16.4 ft/s), giving a travel time of 7 minutes.

The line is operated by two cars, each of which can carry 80 passengers, giving a maximum capacity of 685 passengers per hour per direction. In normal service, the funicular operates every 10 minutes from start of service just before 06:00 to just before 20:00, and then every 20 minutes until it shuts down at midnight.

== Gallery ==
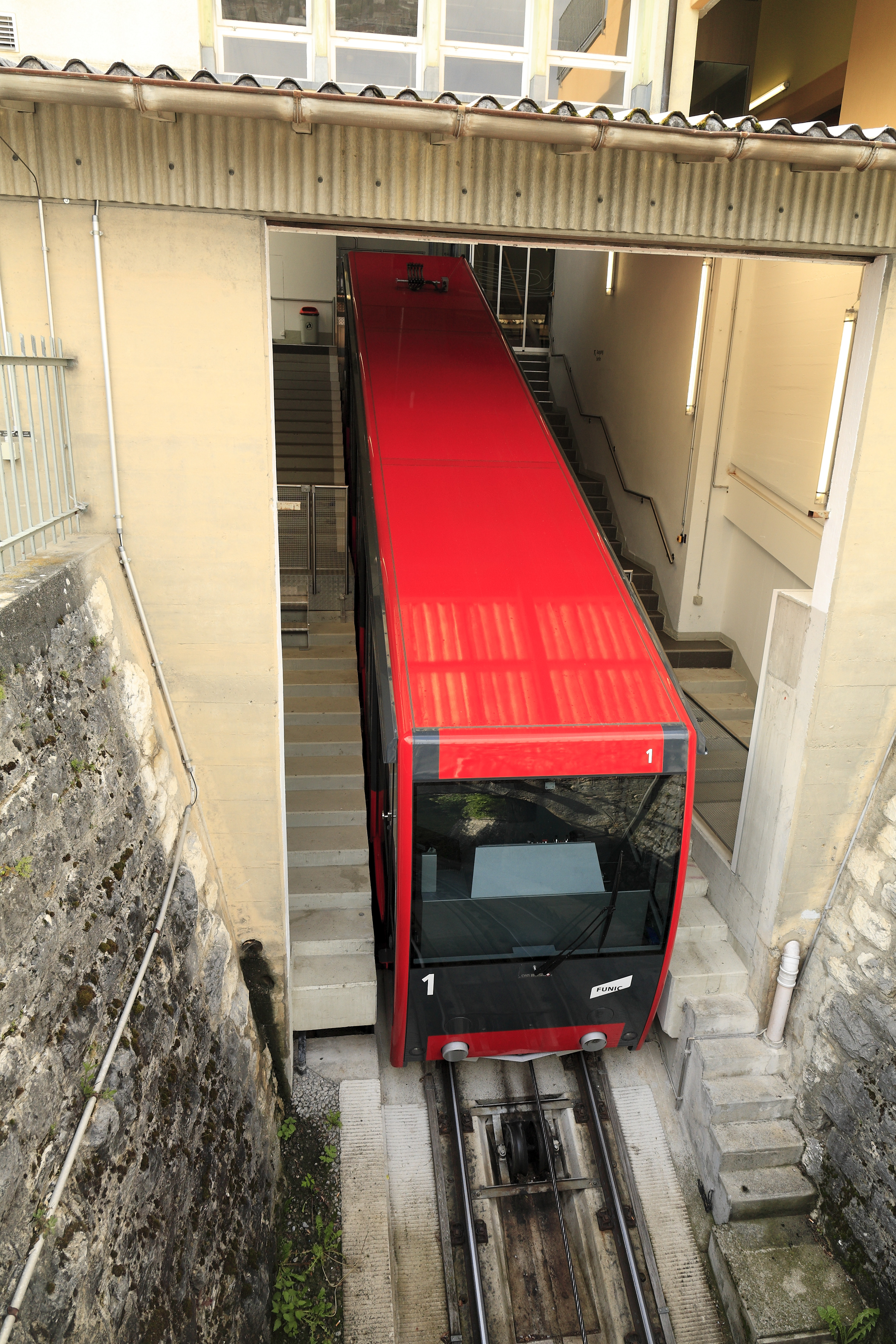
Car in the upper station

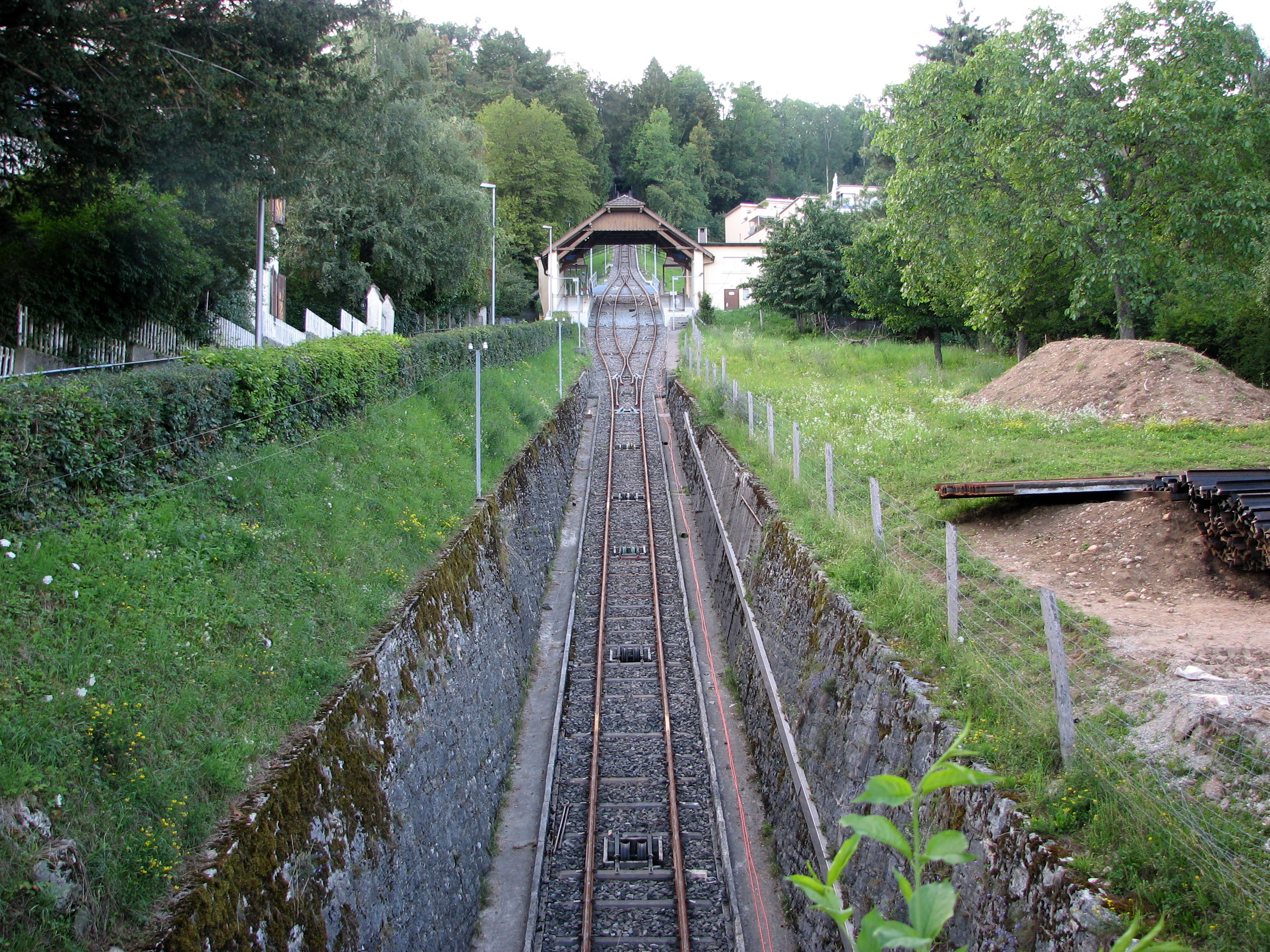
Passing loop and Beaumont station

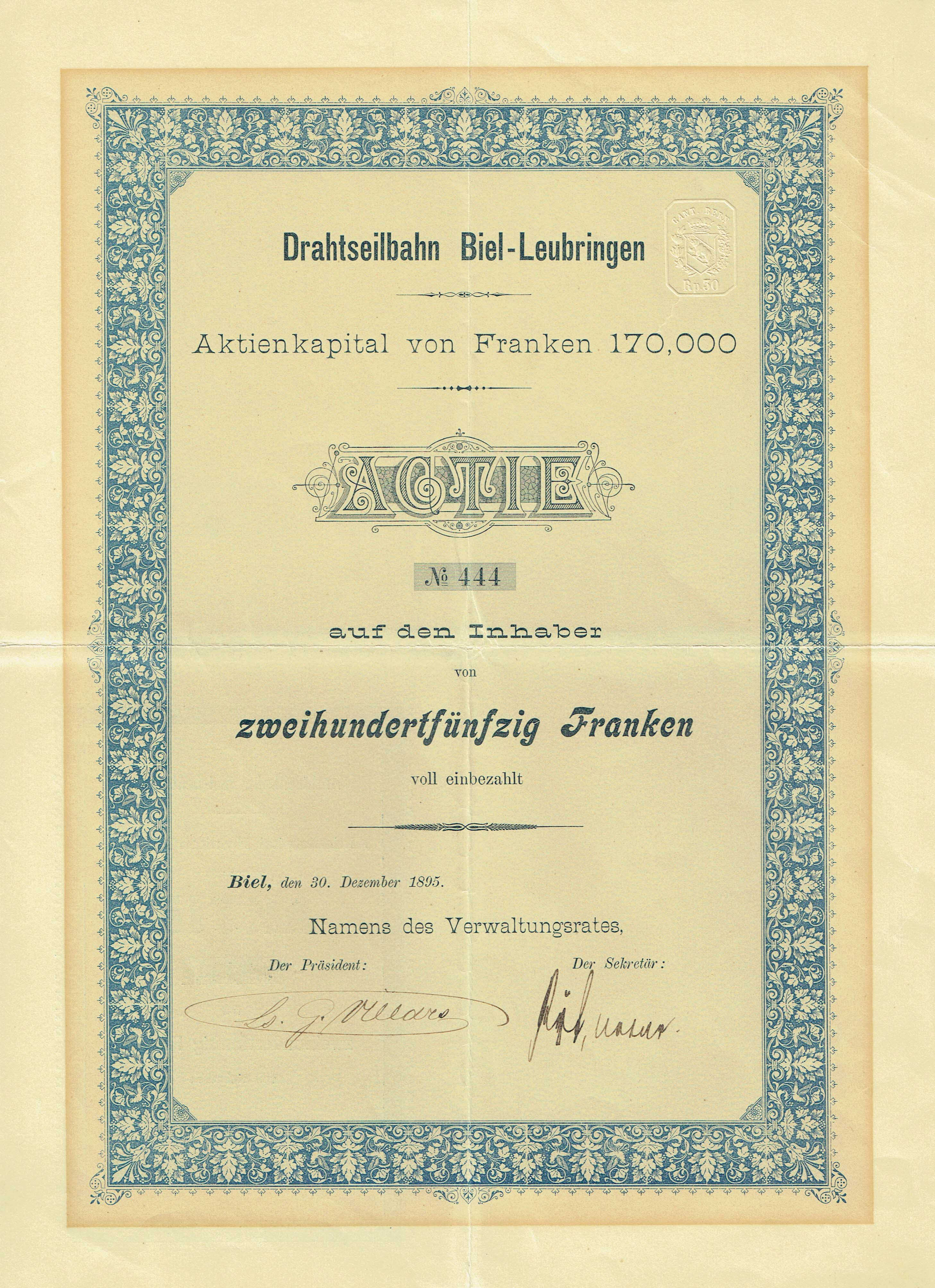
Original share certificate

== See also ==
- List of funicular railways
- List of funiculars in Switzerland
