= Biel–Magglingen Funicular =

Funicular railway in Biel/Bienne, Swiss canton of Bern

Coordinates: 47.137366°N 7.224541°E

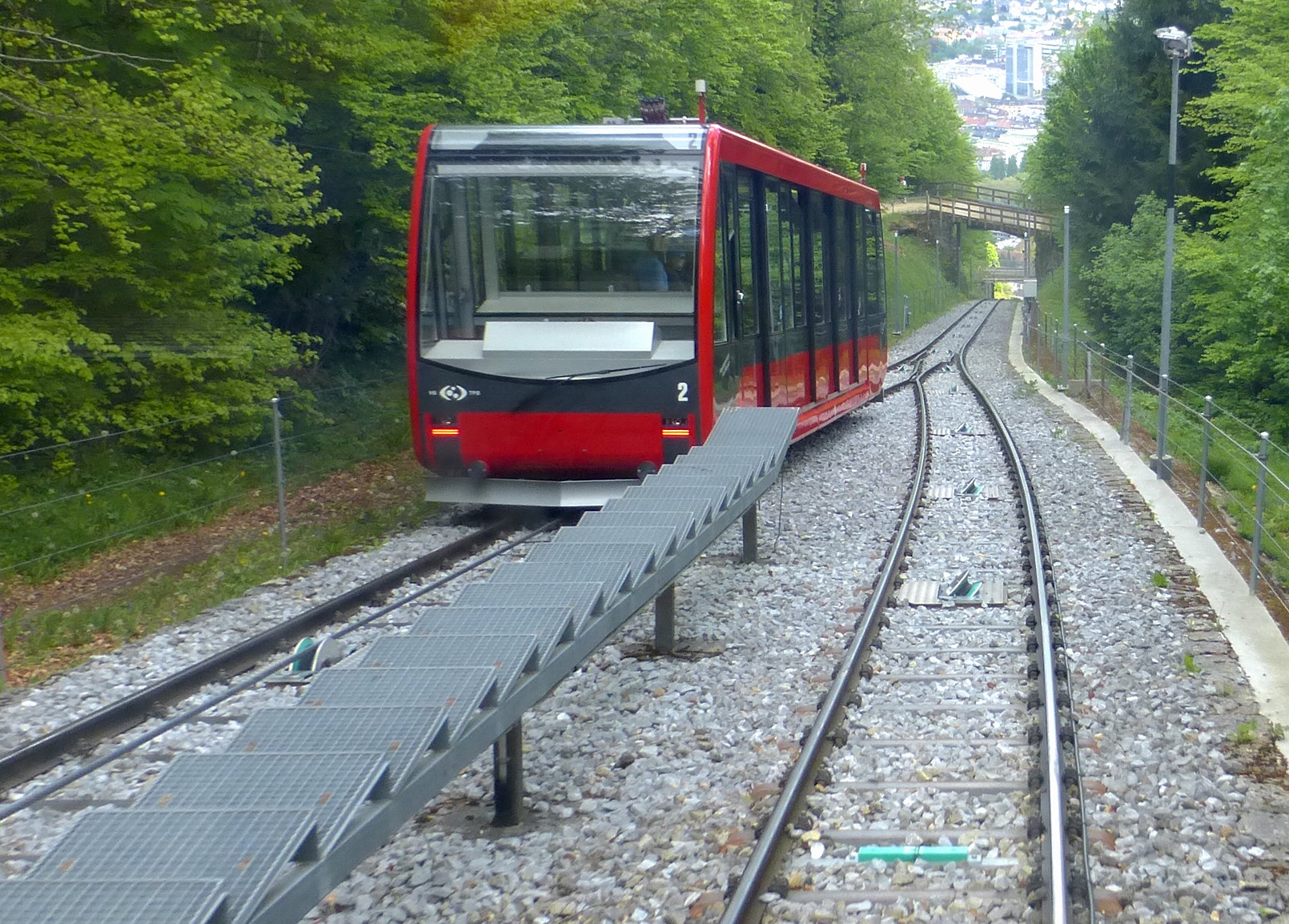
- Car at the intermediate passing loop

Overview
- Other name(s): Drahtseilbahn Biel–Magglingen; Seilbahn Biel–Magglingen; Funiculaire Bienne–Macolin; Standseilbahn Biel–Magglingen; Magglingenbahn
- Status: In operation
- Owner: Verkehrsbetriebe Biel/Transports publics biennois (VB/TPB)
- Locale: Biel/Bienne, Switzerland
- Termini: "Biel/Bienne Magglingenb.(Funi)" at Seevorstadt 21; "Magglingen/Macolin"
- Stations: 3

Service
- Type: Funicular
- Operator: Verkehrsbetriebe Biel/Transports publics biennois (VB/TPB)
- Rolling stock: 2

History
- Opened: 2 June 1887 (139 years ago)
- Enhancements: 1923, 1954, 2001, 2019

Technical
- Line length: 1,693 m (5,554 ft)
- Number of tracks: 1 with passing loop
- Rack system: (initially Riggenbach)
- Electrification: 1954
- Operating speed: 6 metres per second (19.7 ft/s)
- Highest elevation: 875 metres (2,871 ft)
- Maximum incline: 32%

The Biel–Magglingen Funicular (German: Magglingenbahn; French: Funiculaire Bienne–Macolin) is a funicular railway in the bilingual city of Biel/Bienne in the Swiss canton of Bern. The funicular links Biel/Bienne with Magglingen/Macolin, in the Jura Mountains above the town. It is owned and operated by Verkehrsbetriebe Biel/Transports publics biennois (VB/TPB), the city's public transport operator.

== History ==
The funicular was built in 1887, by Pümpin, Herzog & Cie of Bern, for the Drahtseilbahn-Gesellschaft Biel-Magglingen. As built it was a water powered line, with a Riggenbach rack rail for braking. The line had a three-rail layout, with the two cars sharing the centre rail, and a central passing loop. It was rebuilt by Von Roll in 1923, still with water power but with an increase in water capacity.

The line was rebuilt again by Von Roll in 1954, when it was converted to electrical operation, the Riggenbach rack rail removed, and the three-rail sections replaced by conventional single track. In 2000, the owning company merged with the owners of the nearby Bienne–Evilard Funicular to form FUNIC AG. In 2001 the line was completely renovated by Doppelmayr, with new panoramic cars. In 2014, FUNIC AG was acquired by the VB/TPB.

The original lower station building of the funicular is still in use, and is inscribed on the Swiss Inventory of Cultural Property of National and Regional Significance.

== Operation ==
The line has a length of 1,693 metres (5,554 ft), a maximum incline of 32%, overcomes a difference of elevation of 442 metres (1,450 ft) and reaches a maximum elevation of 875 metres (2,871 ft). It has a single track with an intermediate passing loop. Besides the two terminal stations, it also serves an intermediate station at Hohfluh. Cars run at a maximum speed of 6 metres per second (19.7 ft/s), giving a travel time of 6 to 8 minutes, depending on whether an intermediate stop is made.

The line is operated by two cars, each of which can carry 120 passengers, giving a maximum capacity of 1050 passengers per hour per direction. In normal service, the funicular operates every 15 minutes from start of service just before 06:00 to just before 20:00, and then half-hourly until it shuts down just before midnight. Hohfluh is served half-hourly until 20:00, with no later service.

== Gallery ==
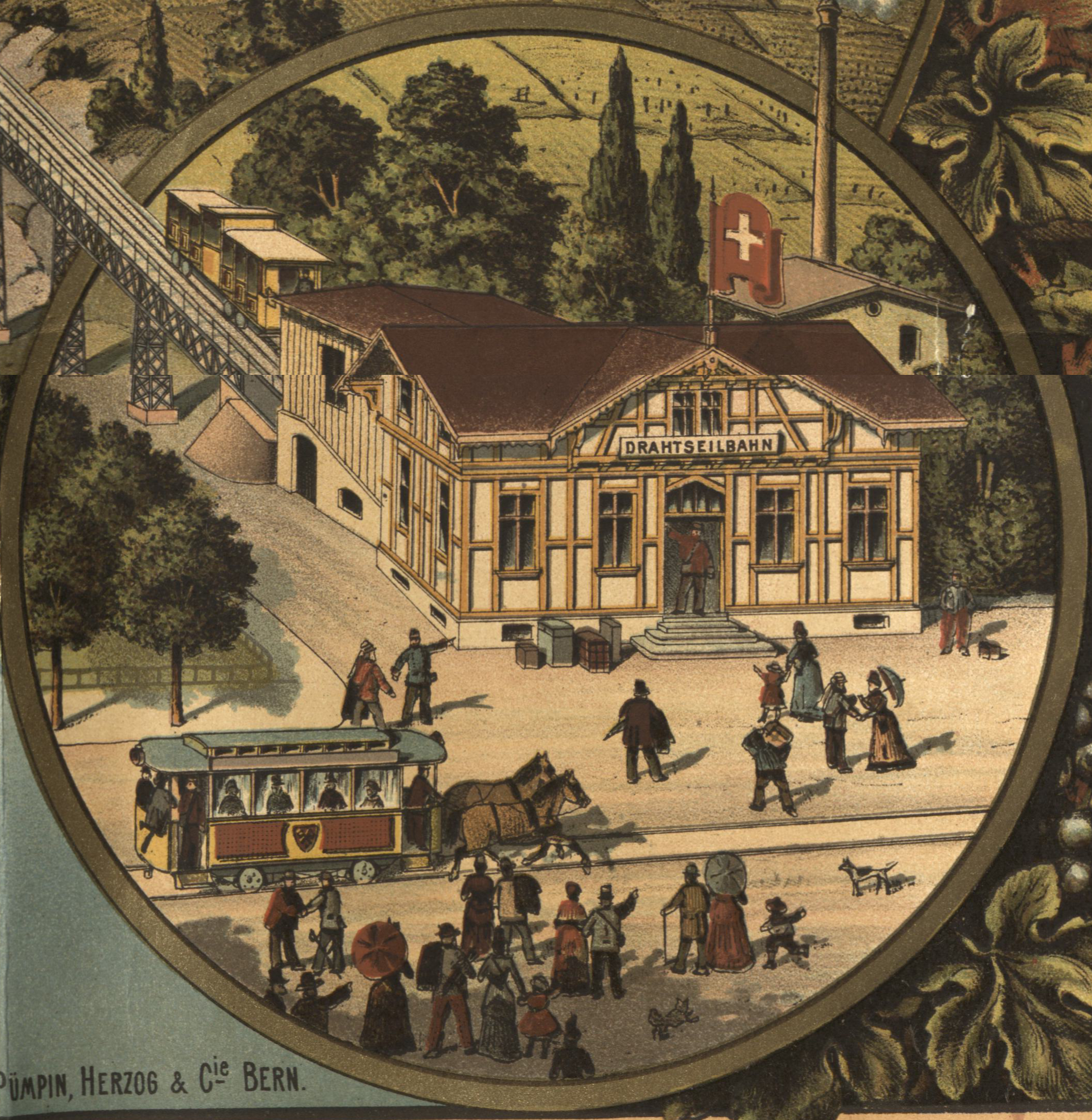
Lower station from before 1910, as seen on a poster

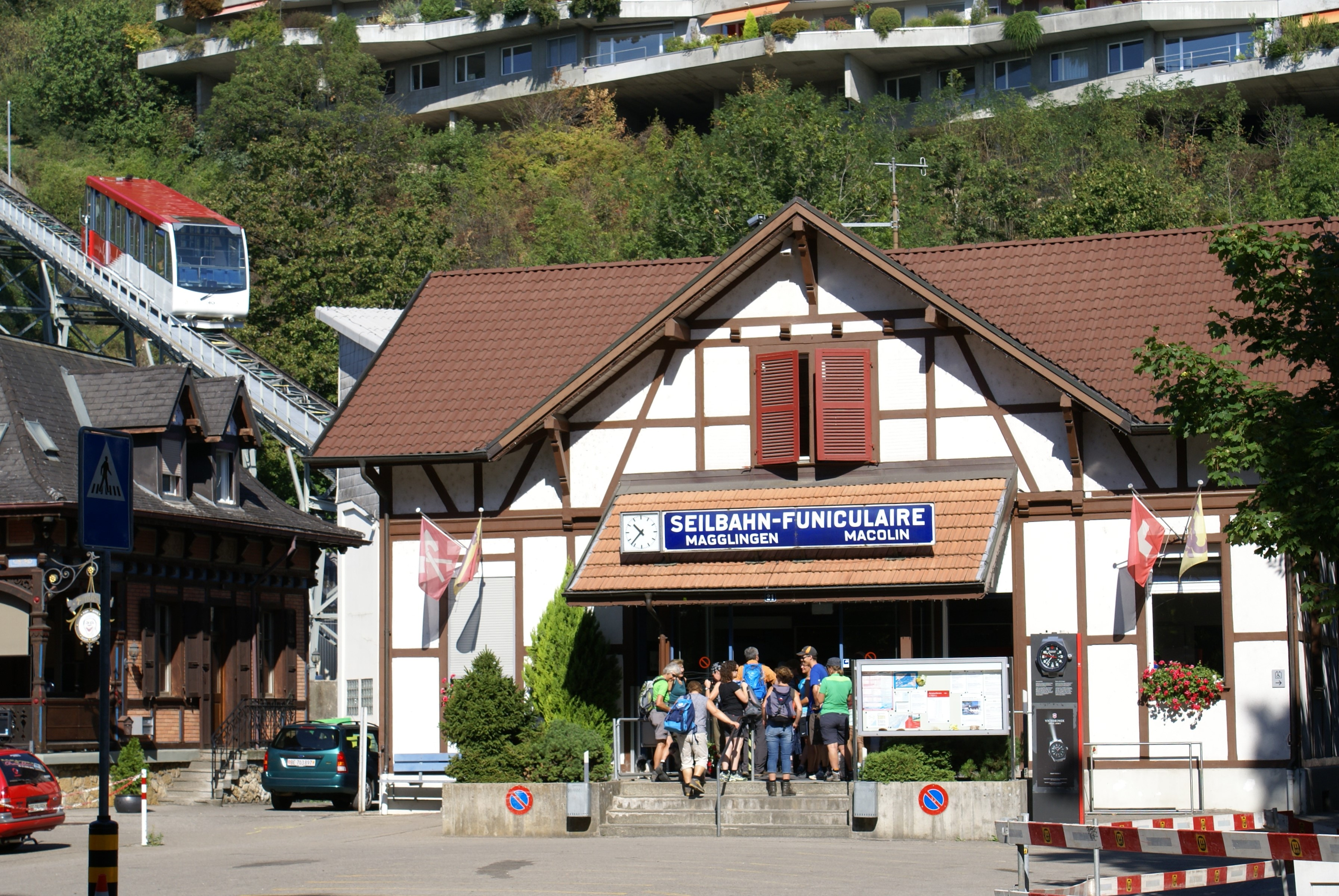
Lower station in 2015, with funicular car approaching over the adjacent bridge

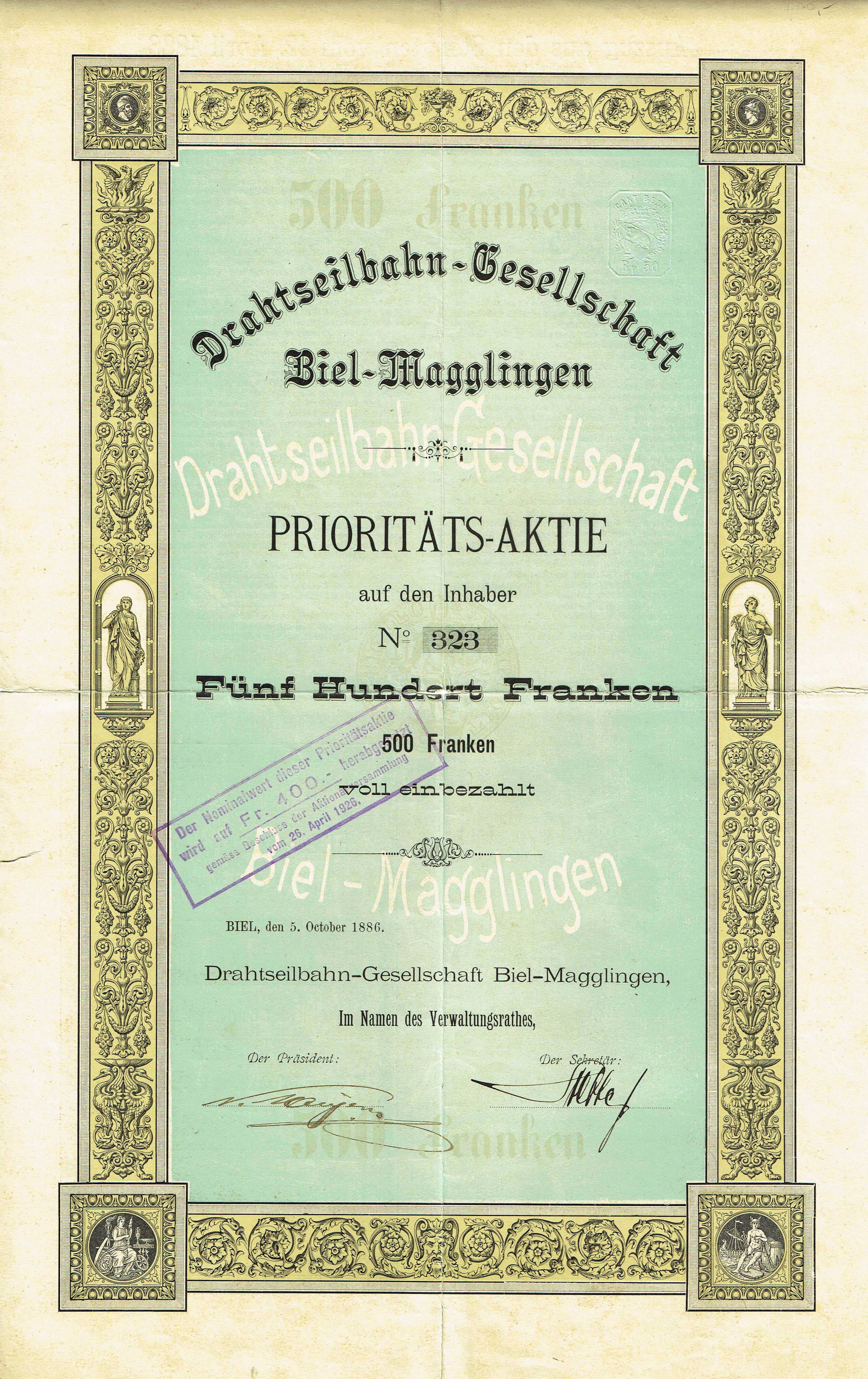
Original share certificate

== See also ==
- List of funicular railways
- List of funiculars in Switzerland
