= Trams in Biel/Bienne =

Tramway network in Biel/Bienne, Switzerland

Coordinates: 47°07′56″N 07°14′37″E

Biel/Bienne tramway network
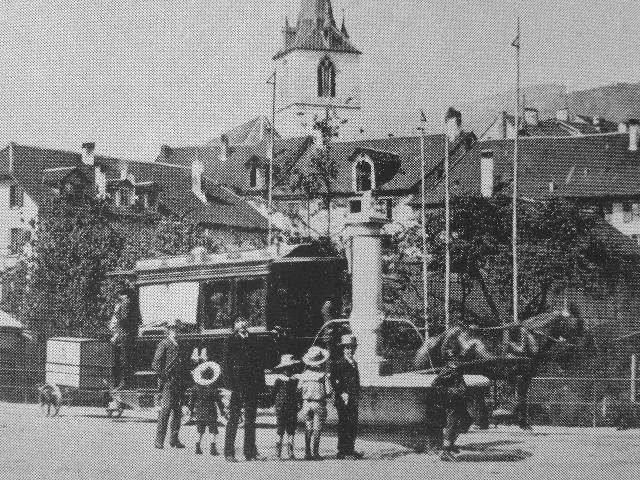
- The horsecar tramway, 1890s.

Operation
- Locale: Biel/Bienne, Switzerland

Statistics
Horsecar era: 1877–1902
- Status: Closed
- Track gauge: 1,435 mm (4 ft 8 1/2 in) standard gauge
- Propulsion system: Horses
Electric era: 1902–1948
- Status: Closed
- Track gauge: 1,000 mm (3 ft 3 3/8 in) metre gauge
- Propulsion system: Electricity
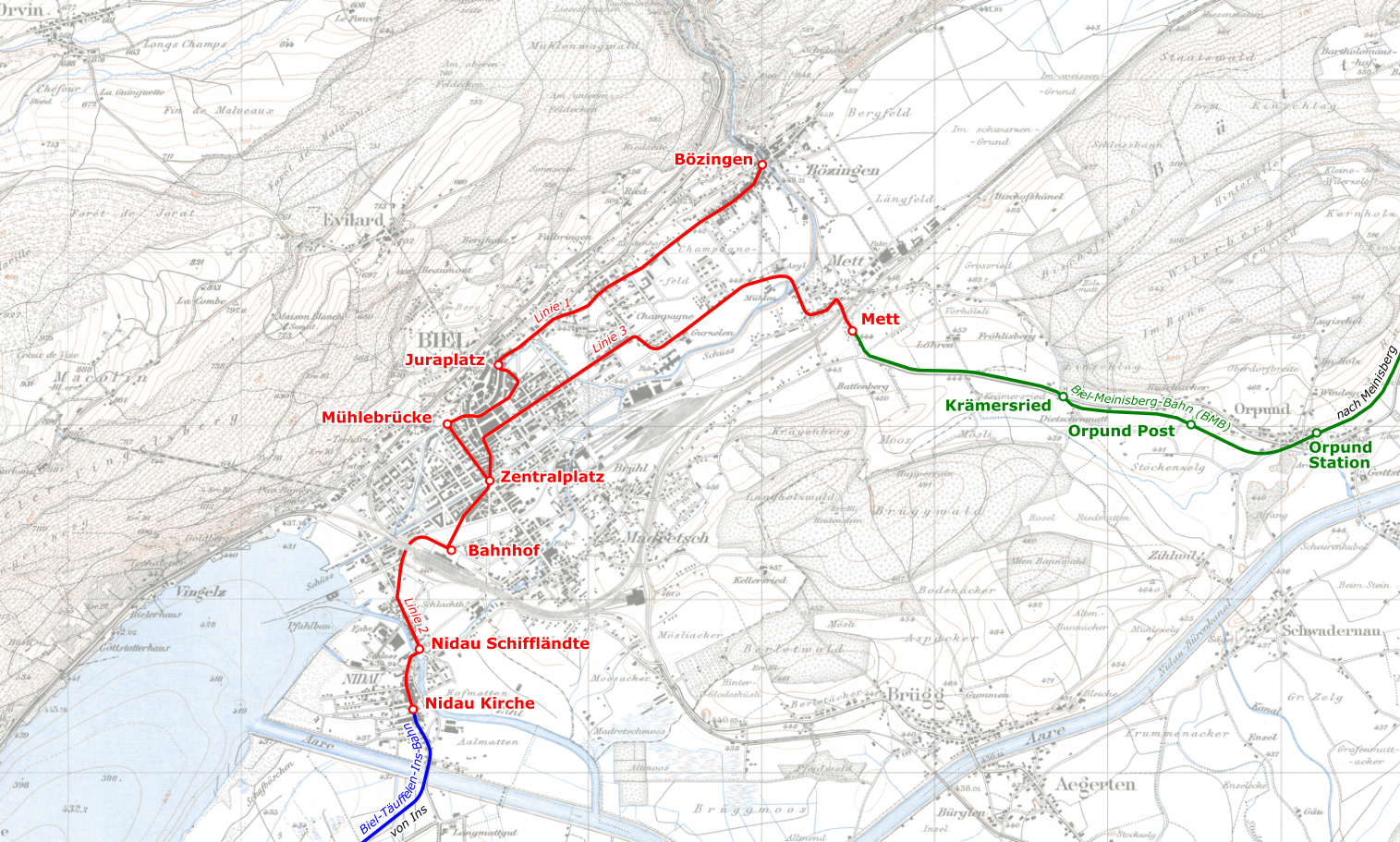

The Biel/Bienne tramway (Alemannic German: Strassenbahn Biel; French: Tramway de Bienne) was part of the public transport network of the bilingual city of Biel/Bienne, in the canton of Bern, Switzerland, and its environs for more than 70 years. Opened in 1877, the network operated as a horsecar tramway (Rösslitram) until 1902, when it was electrified and converted from 1,435 mm (4 ft 8 1/2 in) standard gauge to 1,000 mm (3 ft 3 3/8 in) metre gauge.

Initially, the operator was the Compagnie générale des tramways suisses (TS) of Geneva, a predecessor of today's Transports Publics Genevois (TPG). From 1901, the operator was Städtische Strassenbahn Biel / Tramway de Bienne (TrB), from which the present-day Verkehrsbetriebe Biel (VB) / Transports publics biennois (TPB) emerged. In the 1940s, the tramways were gradually replaced by the Biel/Bienne trolleybus system and motor buses, until the network's closure in 1948. The tramway tracks were only removed in 1954 when the roads were tarred. When they were found in 1953 again, many people wanted to keep them but because of the new bus system this wasn't necessary.

== History ==
=== Horsecar tramways ===
On 18 August 1877, the Compagnie générale des tramways suisses (TS) opened a 1,435 mm (4 ft 8 1/2 in) horsecar tramway from Bözingen/Boujean to Nidau Schiffländte. Biel/Bienne thereby became a very early venue for a tramway, before other Swiss cities such as Basel, Bern und Zurich.

The passenger tramcars, including both closed and open vehicles, were pulled by one or two horses. For mail carriage, a single-axle trailer was available.

The year after the tramway opened, on 23 March 1878, the line was extended 400 m (1,300 ft) to Nidau Kirche. On several occasions, its operating company tried to sell the financially unsuccessful operation to the city of Biel/Bienne. However, a sale took place, without any further line extensions, only in 1901. From then onwards, the network's operator was Städtische Strassenbahn Biel / Tramway de Bienne (TrB).

=== Electric tramways ===
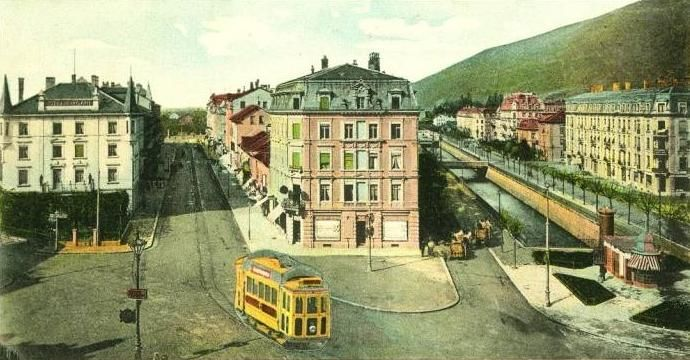
Ce 2/2 1–12 electric tramcar in Zentralplatz / Place Centrale, 1903.

After the 1901 takeover of the horsecar line by the city of Biel/Bienne, work began promptly on its electrification, and conversion to 1,000 mm (3 ft 3 3/8 in) metre gauge. Twelve electric motor tramcars were procured, and individual horse car trams were regauged for use as trailers. By 1902, electric operations had gradually been introduced.

In 1913 a second tramway was opened, to Mett/Mâche, and designated as line 3. There, it connected right from its opening day with the independent Biel–Meinisberg-Bahn (BMB). At the same time, the existing tramway, which had previously operated without line numbers, received the line numbers 1 and 2.

From 1916, the Biel–Täuffelen–Ins-Bahn connected in Nidau with the tramway network.

In 1930, lines 1 and 2 were combined into a new line 1, from Nidau to Bözingen/Boujean. As a result, the old line 3 became a new line 3, and line 4 mutated into a new line 3.

In the 1940s, two of the remaining tram lines were converted to trolleybus operation. The first to be converted was line 2, in 1940. On 8 December 1948, line 1 became a trolleybus route. Meanwhile, line 3 was converted to motor bus operation in 1940.

== Lines ==
At its maximum extent, i.e. between 1926 and 1938, during which period the BMB was also operated by the TrB, the network consisted of the following lines:

Line 1	Bahnhof/Gare – Zentralplatz/Place Centrale – Mühlebrücke/Pont-du-Moulin – Juraplatz/Place Jura – Bözingen/Boujean
Line 2	Bahnhof/Gare – Nidau
Line 3	Bahnhof/Gare – Zentralplatz/Place Centrale – Mett/Mâche
Line 4 / BMB	Bahnhof/Gare – Zentralplatz/Place Centrale – Mett/Mâche – Orpund/Orpond – Safnern – Meinisberg

== Proposed Regiotram ==
In 2011 there was a proposal for the reintroduction of trams to Biel/Bienne with a new system named Regiotram, linking Ipsach with Bözingen/Boujean, via the route of the Biel–Täuffelen–Ins-Bahn. According to the proposal's timeline, a referendum would be held on it in 2013, and construction would have begun in 2016, however the plans were instead cancelled in 2015.

== See also ==
- List of town tramway systems in Switzerland
