= Incidents on the Pittsburgh Light Rail =

Accidents involving the public rail system in Pittsburgh, PA

The official logo of the Pittsburgh Light Rail

Over the course of the years, there have been various incidents on the Pittsburgh Light Rail. While low in number compared to other public rail transit systems in the United States, there have still been many derailments and fatalities associated with this system. Pittsburgh Regional Transit (formerly known as Port Authority) has worked to keep these incidents low in volume.

== Derailments ==
=== December 24, 1917 ===
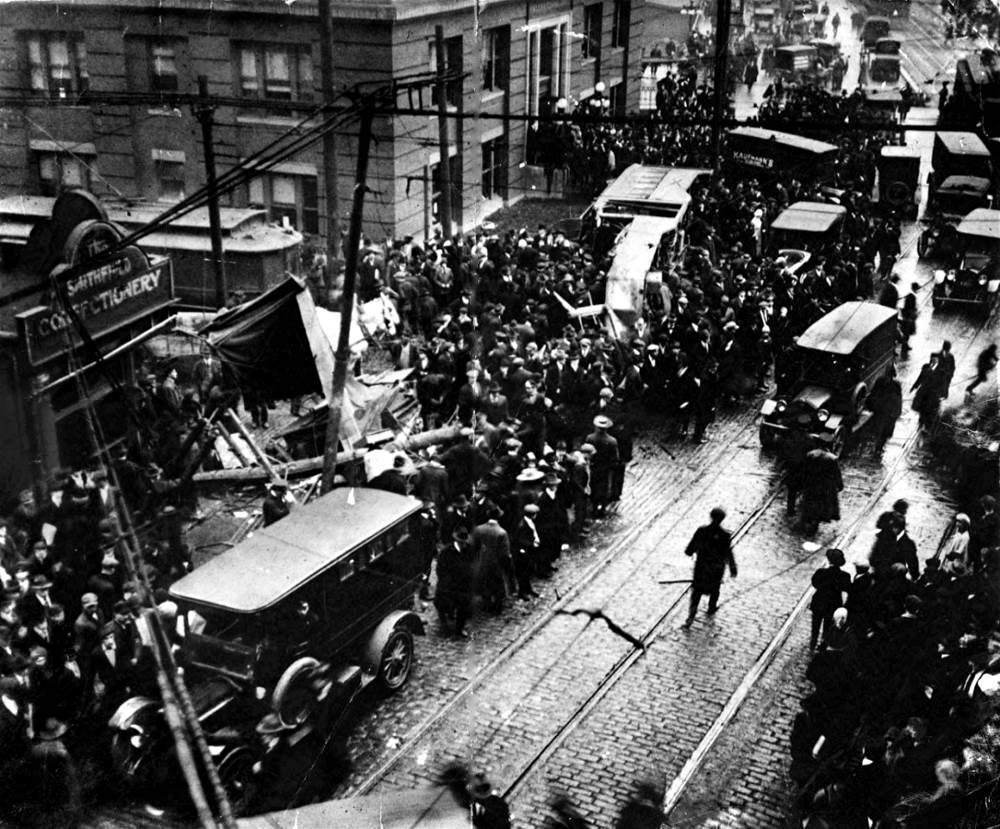
Aftermath of the accident. One train car can be seen on its side with significant damage.

On December 24, 1917, a speeding streetcar lost control coming out of the Mount Washington Tunnel and flipped over onto the heavily-crowded Carson Street. Over twenty people lost their lives, and over 80 were injured in the accident. It was the first documented accident in the history of Pittsburgh's public rail transit, and the deadliest mass-transit incident in the city's history.

=== May 29, 1930 ===
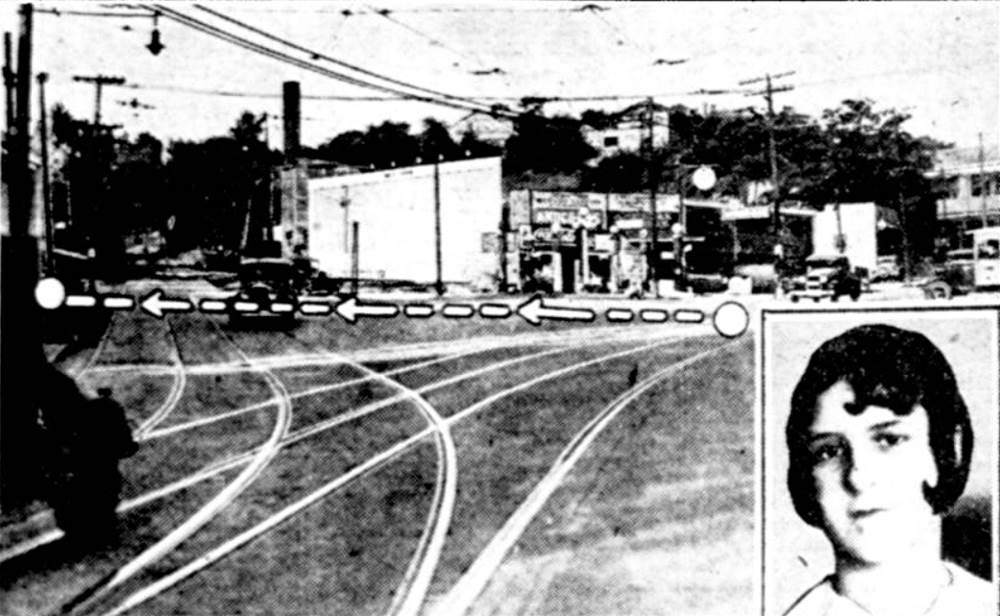
This image shows the path the train took during the crash. Pictured in the bottom right is Elizabeth Hartman, who was amongst one of the injured.

At 12:20 AM EDT on May 29, 1930, a streetcar jumped the tracks at a junction on West Liberty Avenue and crashed sideways into a pole at the other side of the junction. The impact of the pole was at the train's center doors. The operator, 28-year-old A.J. Hogan, blamed a failure of a switch for the crash, claiming it was left open and he could not see in the dark. Even though Hogan applied the emergency brakes, the train still slid about 120 feet down the street into the pole. Nineteen passengers were injured in the accident, none critically. Due to a derailment in the car yard hours prior, all paths had to be re-routed, which may provide an explanation as to why the switch was not properly adjusted for the incoming streetcar.

=== October 28, 1987 ===
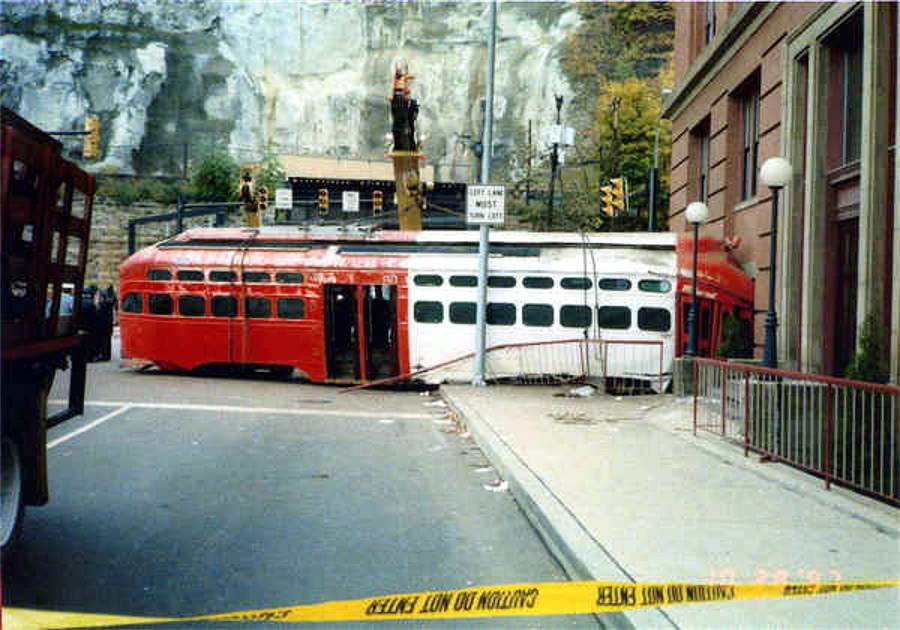
Aftermath of the head-on collision into the railroad building

During the rush hour on October 28, 1987, a streetcar lost control while entering Mount Washington Tunnel, and jumped the tracks after coming out of the other side. It went sideways and landed in Carson Street, nearly mirroring the tragic accident 70 years prior. The streetcar sideswiped a bus and then crashed into the Pittsburgh & Lake Erie Railroad Station building. Thirty-three passengers were injured, along with 8 transit employees. The operator, John Stromple, is credited with saving many lives aboard his train. After losing control, he moved his passengers to the back of the car, to try and minimize injuries suffered.

=== November 9, 2012 ===
Shortly after 9:00 PM EDT on Friday, November 9, 2012, a light rail car derailed while traveling between Wood Street and Gateway stations. The underside of the wheels were severely damaged, as well as a switch in the tunnel. Three passengers were hurt with neck and back injuries, and all stations between Allegheny and Wood Street were closed for two days following the accident.

=== October 5, 2022 ===
At around 10:00 AM EDT on October 5, 2022, a Red Line train derailed near the abandoned Kelton station. There were delays until around 1:30 PM as the train was put back onto the tracks. No injuries were reported.

=== May 13, 2024 ===
At around 4:00 PM EDT on May 13, 2024, an inbound Red Line train derailed after traveling on the outbound tracks while entering Willow station. Though there were delays, no injuries were reported.

== Collisions with Other Pittsburgh Regional Transit Vehicles ==
=== November 14, 1944 ===
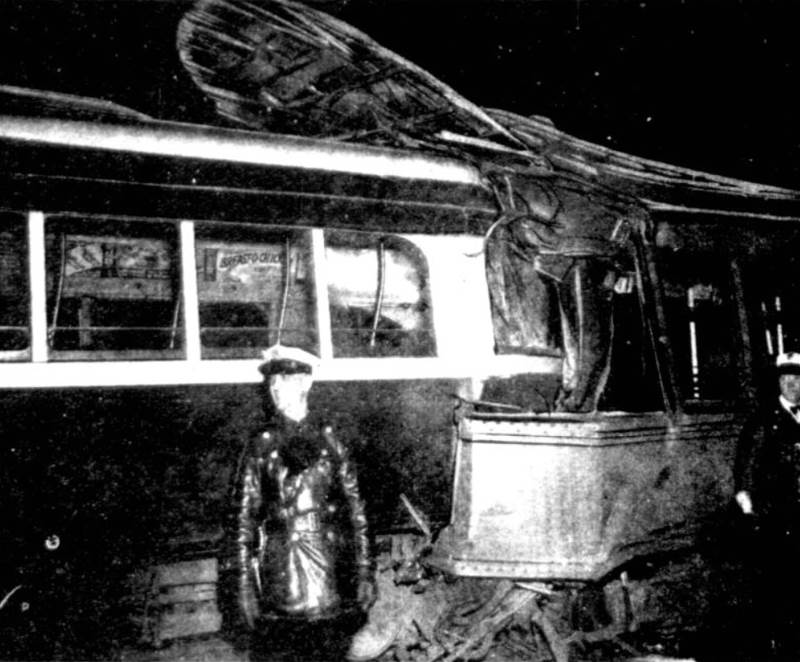
The collision is shown, with a police officer in front of it. One outbound streetcar is seen telescoped onto another.

On November 14, 1944, two streetcars collided during thick fog near Munhall Junction. The outbound car, going towards Homestead, rear-ended a second car going towards East Liberty. The impact was vicious, and the Homestead car was launched on top of the East Liberty car following the impact, which was full of war workers. Five people were killed and another 35 were injured.

=== February 10, 1978 ===
On February 10, 1978, a severe accident took place at Palm Garden station when a northbound 41-D bus and a southbound streetcar crashed into each other along the newly-constructed South Busway, an exclusive right-of-way where streetcars and buses travel at the same time. It was suspected the crash happened due to a faulty switch along the rail line.

The two collided head-on, and the bus knocked down a telephone pole and landed on top of a parked car.

While the streetcar was empty besides the operator, the bus was full with over fifty passengers. Four people were killed, including the bus driver, 55-year-old Anthony Petrusky, and three passengers sat at the front of the vehicle. Twenty-seven other passengers, as well as the streetcar operator, were injured. The busway had opened just months prior, and concerns had been raised about having buses and streetcars on the same road.

=== September 12, 1980 ===
On September 12, 1980, two streetcars collided near South Hills Junction. An outbound train started rocking off the tracks and fell into the path of an inbound train. The two sideswiped each other, and thus prevented either car from flipping onto its side. Four people were injured, all passengers of the outbound train.

=== June 26, 1986 ===
On June 26, 1986, two streetcars collided head-on while traveling on West Carson Street. The cars were traveling at low speeds in opposite directions on a single-track area, and were going around a bend when the crash occurred. The operators of the streetcars could not see each other due to an obstruction in the bend, and crashed into each other. Fourteen people were injured, including both operators and 12 passengers.

== Collisions with Road Vehicles ==
=== July 15, 2014 ===
At 11:25 AM EDT on Tuesday, July 15, 2014, an inbound Red Line light rail train collided with a car attempting to cross the tracks at Arlington station. The car was hit broadside by the front of the light rail vehicle, which knocked the car against a guardrail, trapping both occupants inside. One was injured and transported to the hospital. No one on the light rail car was hurt. Witnesses to the accident said the warning lights of an oncoming train came on with no malfunction, and it was unknown why the car attempted to make the crossing. Minor closures were reported.

=== November 8, 2017 ===
At 9:20 AM EDT on Wednesday, November 8, 2017, a Red Line train crashed into the side of a pickup truck attempting to cross the tracks, while traveling between Dormont Junction and Potomac. The driver of the truck was injured and taken to the hospital. No one on the light rail car was hurt. Minor service delays were reported.

=== October 1, 2026 ===
In the afternoon on Thursday, October 1, 2026, a car crashed into the side of a Red Line train at Poplar. Two people were taken to the hospital. The driver of the car sustained a head injury, and a passenger on the train was treated for a knee injury.

== Pedestrian Accidents ==
=== November 10, 2017 ===
In the afternoon on November 10, 2017, a 61-year-old woman was hit by a Blue Line train at Willow. She was taken to the hospital and survived.

=== November 23, 2019 ===
In the early morning hours of November 23, 2019, 56-year-old Mark Stephan Setar was struck by a train at South Hills Village. His body was found on the tracks by an operator around 6:00 AM local time, and investigators believe he had been hit by the previous train. Setar's death is the only fatality of the Pittsburgh Light Rail's modern system, and is the first and only death of the entire system since 1978.

== Fires ==
=== October 22, 2024 ===
At around 9:00 AM EDT on October 22, 2024, the power lines above the Silver Line tracks between Lytle and Washington Junction fell onto a northbound light rail train right in front of the abandoned Center station, causing a fire to break out. The twenty-five passengers on board had to be evacuated, but no injuries were reported. The fire promptly put itself out relatively quickly, but the entirety of the Silver Line was shut down for some four hours following the incident.
