= Linden Grove station =

Linden Grove
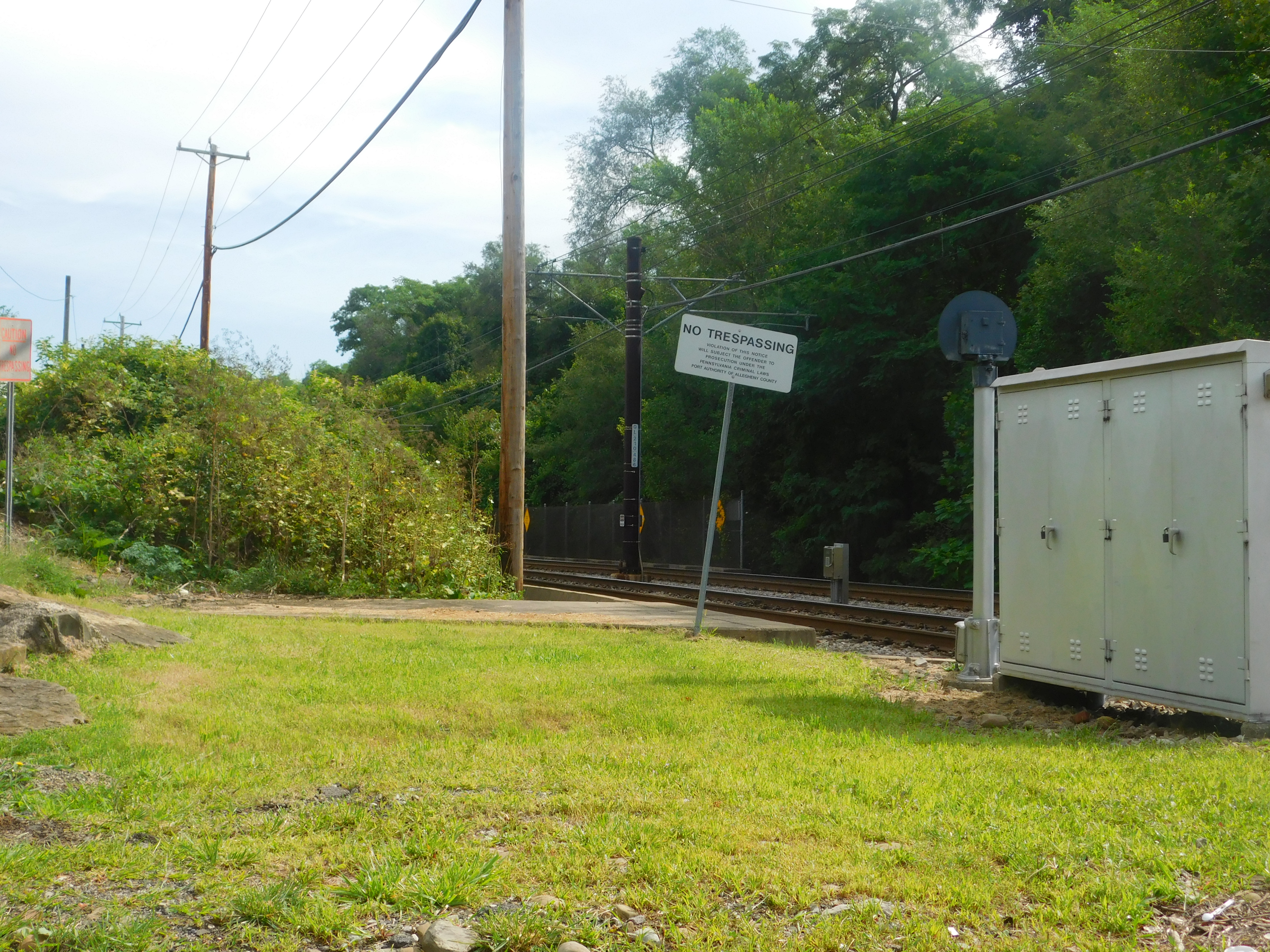

General information
- Location: Willow Avenue and Sleepy Hollow Road; Castle Shannon, Pennsylvania
- Coordinates: 40.3680°N 80.0142°W
- Owner: Port Authority
- Platforms: 2 side platforms
- Tracks: 2

Construction
- Parking: none

History
- Opened: 1872
- Closed: 1993

Services
Preceding station	Port Authority of Allegheny County	Following station
Cooley toward Gateway	47D Drake 1984–1993	Memorial Hall toward Drake
Cooley toward Gateway	47L Library via Overbrook	Memorial Hall toward Library
Cooley toward Gateway	47S South Hills Village via Overbrook	Memorial Hall toward South Hills Village
Location

Linden Grove was a former stop on the Overbrook line, named for a nearby picnic grove and dance hall originally established by Pittsburgh Railways Company's predecessor, the Pittsburgh and Castle Shannon Railroad to increase their passenger revenues. The stop was closed when the Overbrook line shut down in 1993, and was consolidated with the nearby Memorial Hall stop when the line was rebuilt in 2004.

== See also ==
- Linden Grove (Castle Shannon, Pennsylvania)
