= Smith Road station =

Smith Road
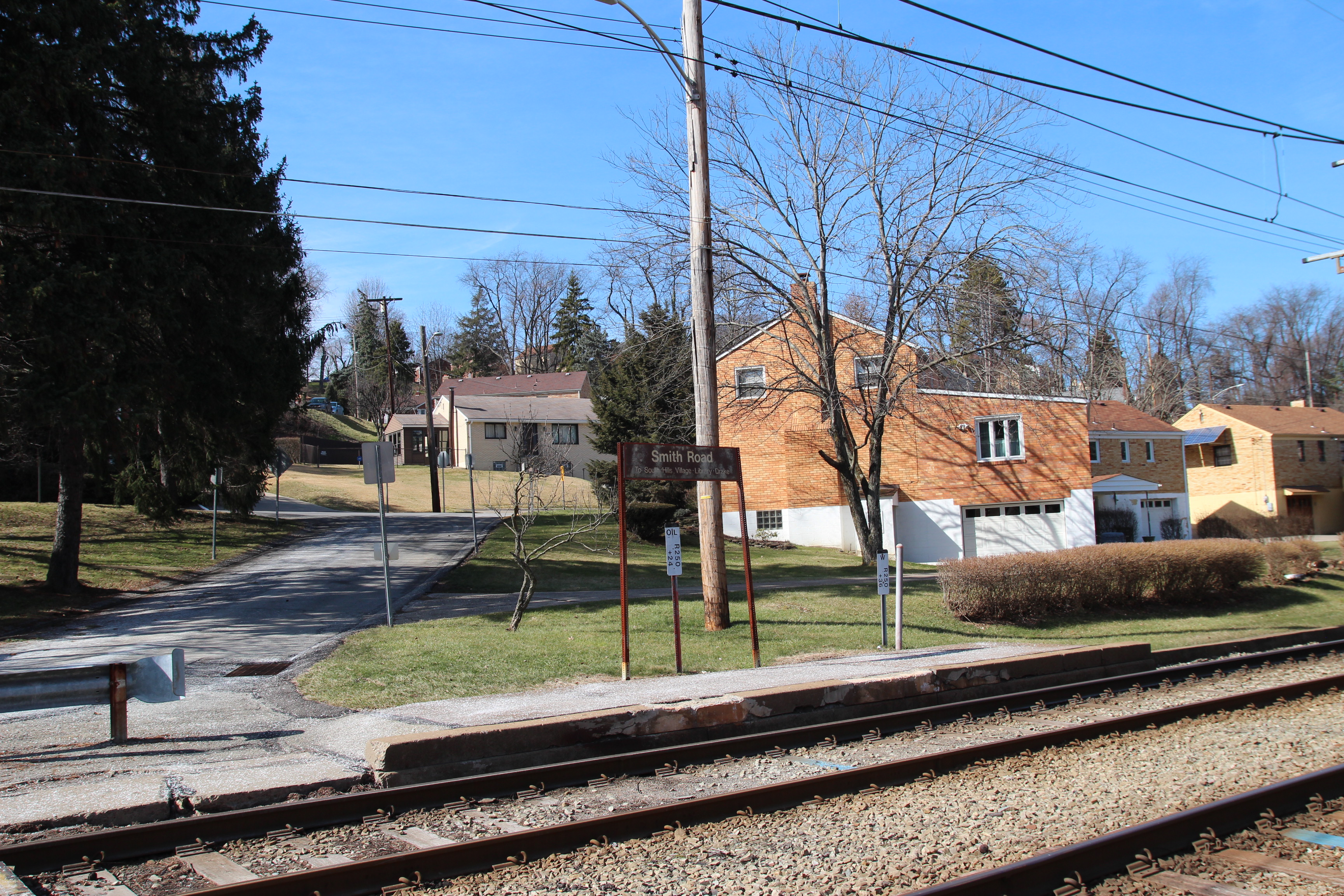
- Smith Road station southbound platform

General information
- Location: Library Road at Smith Road; Castle Shannon, Pennsylvania
- Coordinates: 40.3568°N 80.0292°W
- Owner: Pittsburgh Regional Transit
- Platforms: 2 side platforms
- Tracks: 2

Construction
- Structure type: At-grade
- Accessible: No, under construction

History
- Rebuilt: 1984

Passengers
- 2018: 42 (weekday boardings)

Services
Preceding station	Pittsburgh Regional Transit	Following station
St. Anne's toward Allegheny	Blue Line	Washington Junction toward South Hills Village
St. Anne's toward Allegheny	Red Line	Washington Junction toward South Hills Village
St. Anne's toward Allegheny	Silver Line	Washington Junction toward Library
Former services
Preceding station	Port Authority of Allegheny County	Following station
St. Anne's toward Gateway	47D Drake 1984–1993	Washington Junction toward Drake
Location

Smith Road station is a stop on the Pittsburgh Light Rail network, operated by Pittsburgh Regional Transit, serving Castle Shannon, Pennsylvania. It is a street-level stop consisting of two low-level side platforms for boarding and is not accessible.

Smith Road was originally among 13 stops proposed for discontinuation on June 25, 2012, as part of a service consolidation intended to reduce travel times. However, the closure of Smith Road was not implemented.

In May 2024, the Federal Transit Administration awarded Pittsburgh Regional Transit $8 million to construct accessible platforms at ten Red Line stops, including Smith Road.
