= Overbrook Junction station =

Overbrook Junction
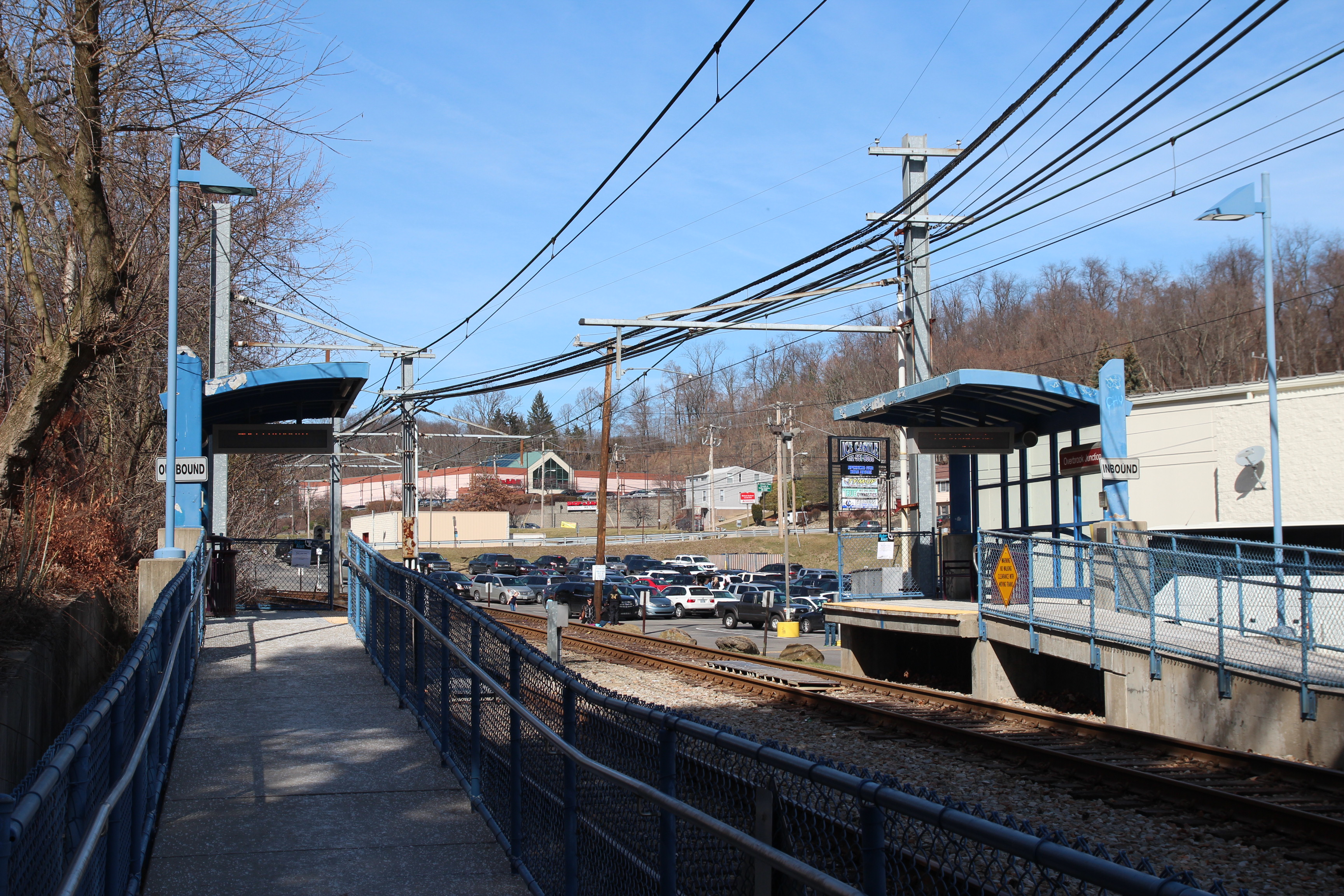
- Station platforms, looking north

General information
- Location: Willow Avenue and James Street; Castle Shannon, Pennsylvania
- Coordinates: 40.3657°N 80.0270°W
- Owner: Pittsburgh Regional Transit
- Tracks: 2
- Connections: Blue Silver at Willow

Construction
- Structure type: At-grade
- Accessible: Yes

History
- Opened: 2004

Passengers
- 2018: 115 (weekday boardings)

Services
Preceding station	Pittsburgh Regional Transit	Following station
Castle Shannon toward Allegheny	Red Line	St. Anne's toward South Hills Village
Former services
Preceding station	Port Authority of Allegheny County	Following station
Castle Shannon toward Allegheny	Red Line South Hills Village via Beechview	Martin Villa Closed 2012 toward South Hills Village
Castle Shannon toward Allegheny	Red Line Overbrook Junction via Beechview	Terminus
Location

Overbrook Junction station is a station on the Beechview branch of the Pittsburgh Regional Transit's light rail network which serves Castle Shannon, Pennsylvania.

== History ==
Overbrook Junction was built as part of the 2004 reopening of the Overbrook line. It is the transfer point between the Beechview (serving Castle Shannon, Mt. Lebanon, Dormont, and Beechview) and Overbrook (serving Overbrook, Carrick, Bon Air, and Belzhoover) lines. No parking is available at the site. Since park and ride commuters can more conveniently reach the nearby Castle Shannon station, Overbook Junction almost exclusively serves nearby apartments and individuals switching trains. During peak hours, Red Line trains used to terminate at this station, requiring commuters who need to travel farther south to use the short footpath to Willow.
