= Hillcrest station =

Hillcrest
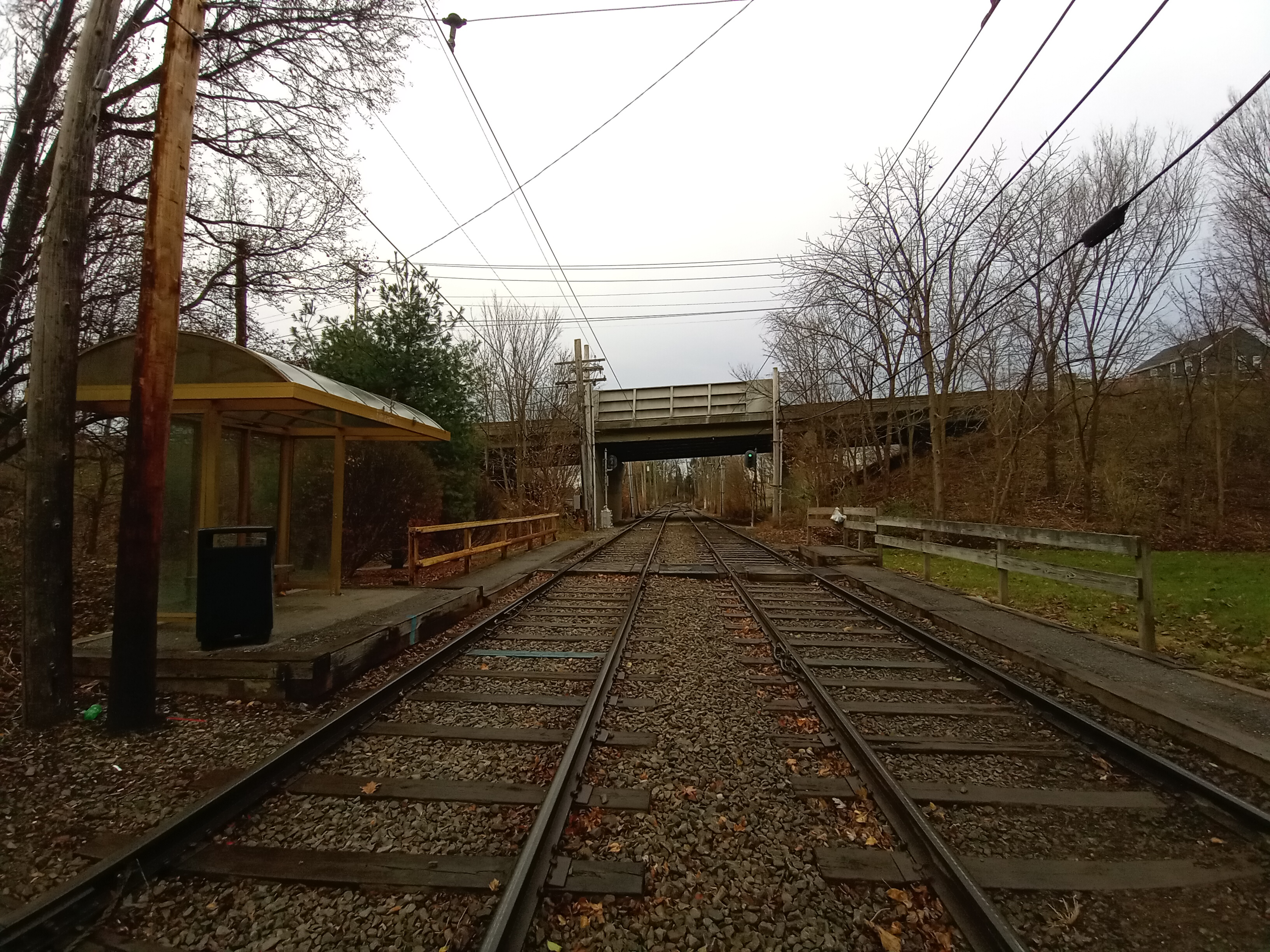
- A wide view of Hillcrest station.

General information
- Location: Hillcrest Street at Bethel Church Road; Bethel Park, Pennsylvania
- Coordinates: 40.3454°N 80.0288°W
- Owner: Pittsburgh Regional Transit
- Line: Library Line
- Platforms: 2 side platforms
- Tracks: 2

Construction
- Structure type: At-grade
- Accessible: No

History
- Rebuilt: 1987

Passengers
- 2018: 38 (weekday boardings)

Services
Preceding station	Pittsburgh Regional Transit	Following station
Washington Junction toward Allegheny	Silver Line	Lytle toward Library
Former services
Preceding station	Port Authority of Allegheny County	Following station
Mine 3 Closed 2012 toward Allegheny	Blue Line Library	Lindermer Closed 2012 toward Library
Location

Hillcrest station is a stop on the Pittsburgh Light Rail network, operated by Pittsburgh Regional Transit, serving Bethel Park, Pennsylvania. It is a small, street-level stop used by local residents traveling to and from Downtown Pittsburgh. The station consists of two low-level side platforms for street-level boarding and is not accessible.

== History ==
The grade crossing of Bethel Church Road was replaced by the Hillcrest bridge in September 1987.
