= St. Anne's station (Pittsburgh) =

St. Anne's
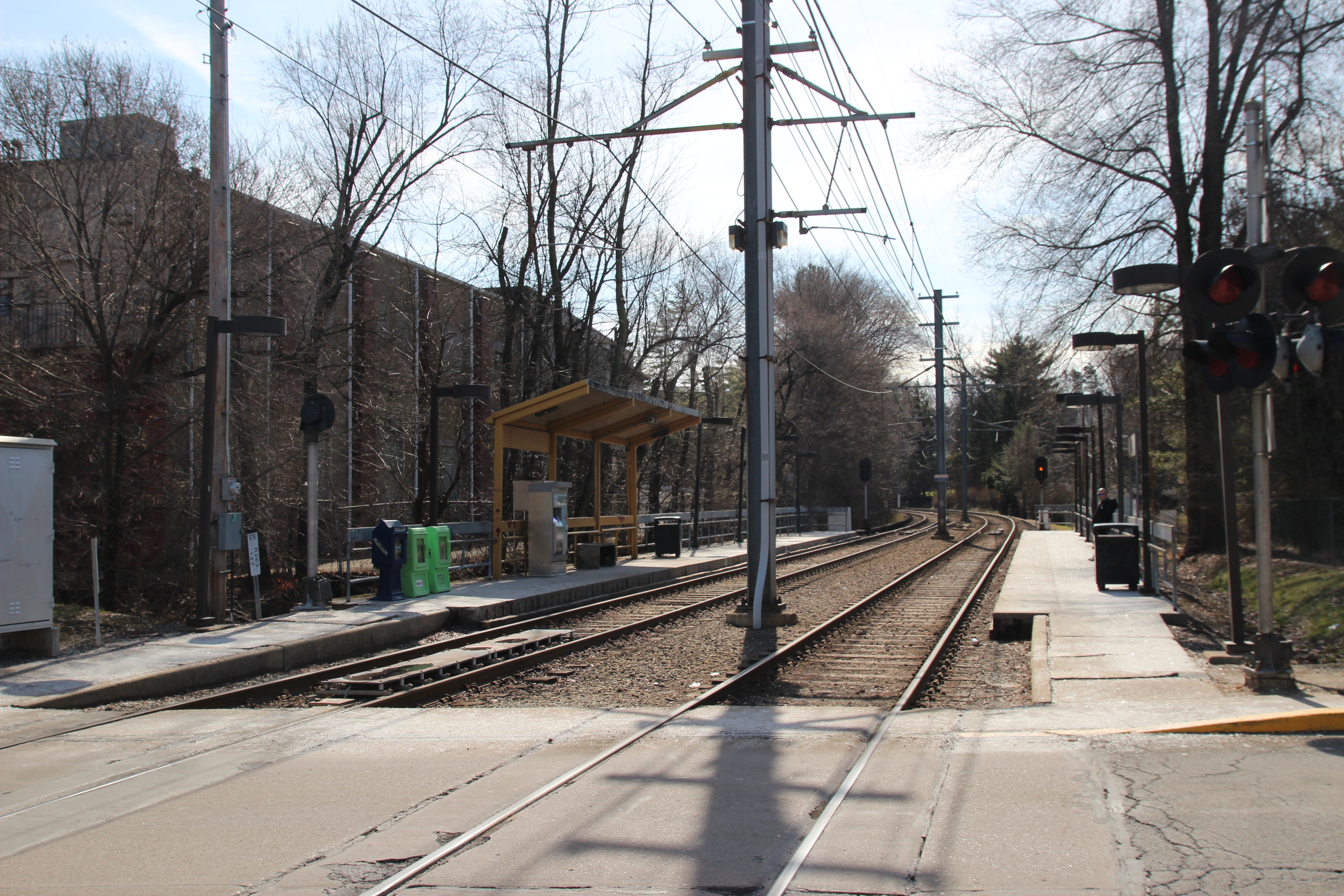

General information
- Location: Rockwood Avenue at Canal Street; Castle Shannon, Pennsylvania
- Coordinates: 40.3611°N 80.0292°W
- Owner: Pittsburgh Regional Transit
- Platforms: 2 side platforms
- Tracks: 2

Construction
- Structure type: At-grade
- Parking: 130 spaces
- Accessible: No, under construction

History
- Rebuilt: April 15, 1984

Passengers
- 2018: 459 (weekday boardings)

Services
Preceding station	Pittsburgh Regional Transit	Following station
Willow toward Allegheny	Blue Line	Smith Road toward South Hills Village
Overbrook Junction toward Allegheny	Red Line	Smith Road toward South Hills Village
Willow toward Allegheny	Silver Line	Smith Road toward Library
Former services
Preceding station	Port Authority of Allegheny County	Following station
Martin Villa Closed 2012 toward Allegheny	Blue Line Library	Smith Road toward Library
Martin Villa Closed 2012 toward Allegheny	Blue Line South Hills Village via Overbrook	Smith Road toward South Hills Village
Martin Villa Closed 2012 toward Allegheny	Red Line South Hills Village via Beechview	Smith Road toward South Hills Village
Martin Villa toward Gateway	47D Drake 1984–1993	Smith Road toward Drake
Location

St. Anne's station is a stop on Pittsburgh Regional Transit's light rail network, located in Castle Shannon, Pennsylvania. Unlike every other small, street level stop along the network, St. Anne's features a parking lot. 130 spaces are available to commuters, and the station is also within walking distance of many area residences. While most street level stops are named for the nearest intersecting road, this station bears the name of St. Anne's Catholic School, from which the Port Authority leases the parking facility.

In 2022, the Federal Transit Administration awarded Pittsburgh Regional Transit $28.4 million to construct accessible platforms at four Red Line stops, including St. Anne's.
