= Memorial Hall station (Pittsburgh) =

Memorial Hall
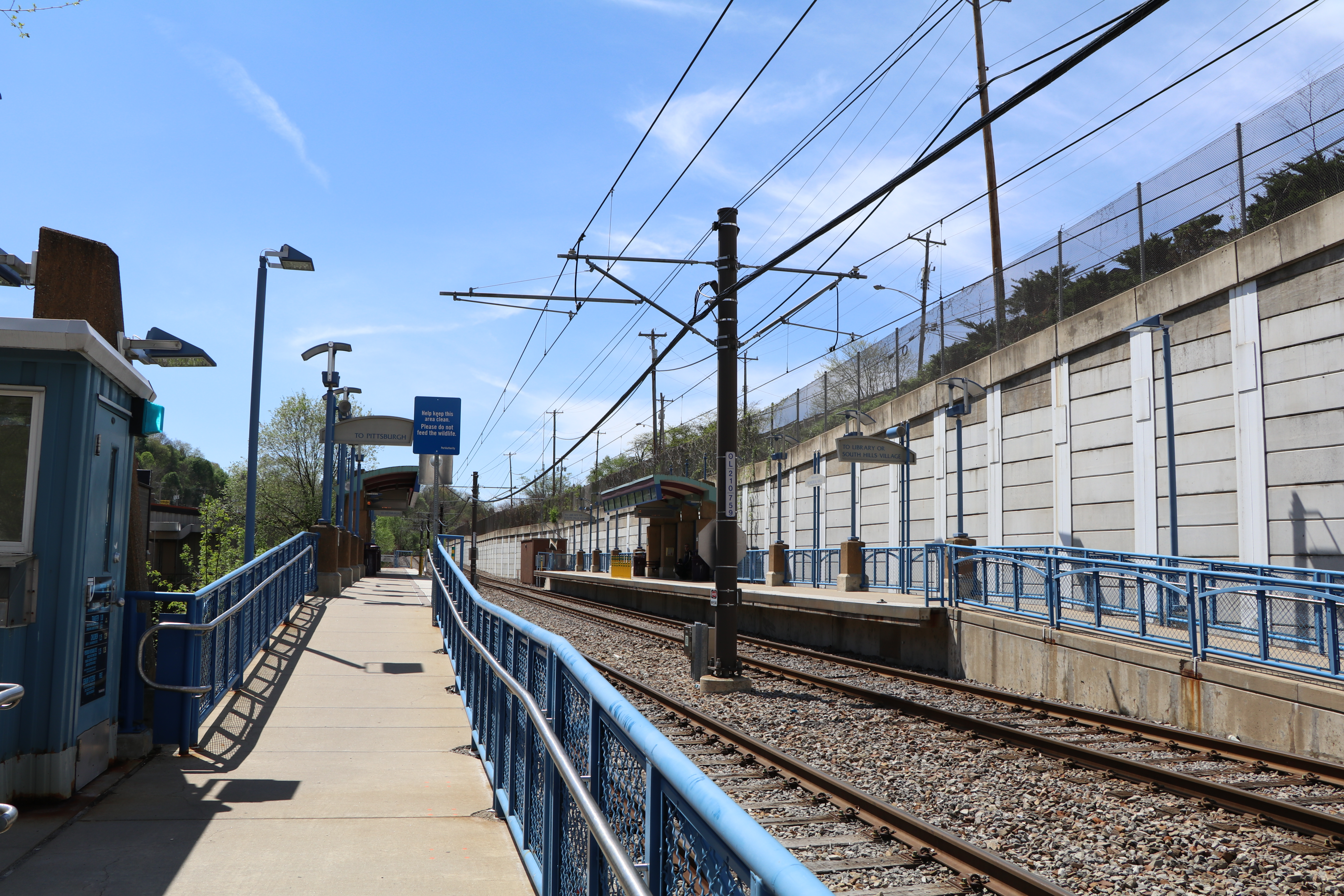
- Memorial Hall station platforms, April 2017

General information
- Location: Willow Avenue and James Street; Castle Shannon, Pennsylvania
- Coordinates: 40.3665°N 80.0164°W
- Owner: Pittsburgh Regional Transit
- Line: Overbrook Line
- Platforms: 2 side platforms
- Tracks: 2

Construction
- Structure type: At-grade
- Parking: 340 spaces
- Accessible: Yes

History
- Opened: unknown
- Closed: 1993–2004
- Rebuilt: 2004

Passengers
- 2018: 782 (weekday boardings)

Services
Preceding station	Pittsburgh Regional Transit	Following station
Killarney toward Allegheny	Blue Line	Willow toward South Hills Village
Killarney toward Allegheny	Silver Line	Willow toward Library
Former services
Preceding station	Port Authority of Allegheny County	Following station
Linden Grove toward Gateway	47D Drake 1984–1993	Poplar Avenue toward Drake
Linden Grove toward Gateway	47L Library via Overbrook	Poplar Avenue toward Library
Linden Grove toward Gateway	47S South Hills Village via Overbrook	Poplar Avenue toward South Hills Village
Location

Memorial Hall station is a station on the Pittsburgh Light Rail network, operated by Pittsburgh Regional Transit, serving Castle Shannon, Pennsylvania. It has two high-level side platforms for level boarding and is accessible. The station serves primarily as a park and ride center, with 340 spaces available for commuters. A variety of residents also walk directly to the station. The stop's name comes from the nearby VFW post. The Port Authority does not own the parking facility but leases it from the nearby Castle Shannon Volunteer Fire Department.

== History ==
Memorial Hall's exact opening date is unknown, but has been a stop on the Overbrook line since the early days of Pittsburgh Railways Company. The stop was closed when the Overbrook line was suspended in 1993, and was completely rebuilt and reopened in 2004.
