= Sandy Creek station =

Sandy Creek
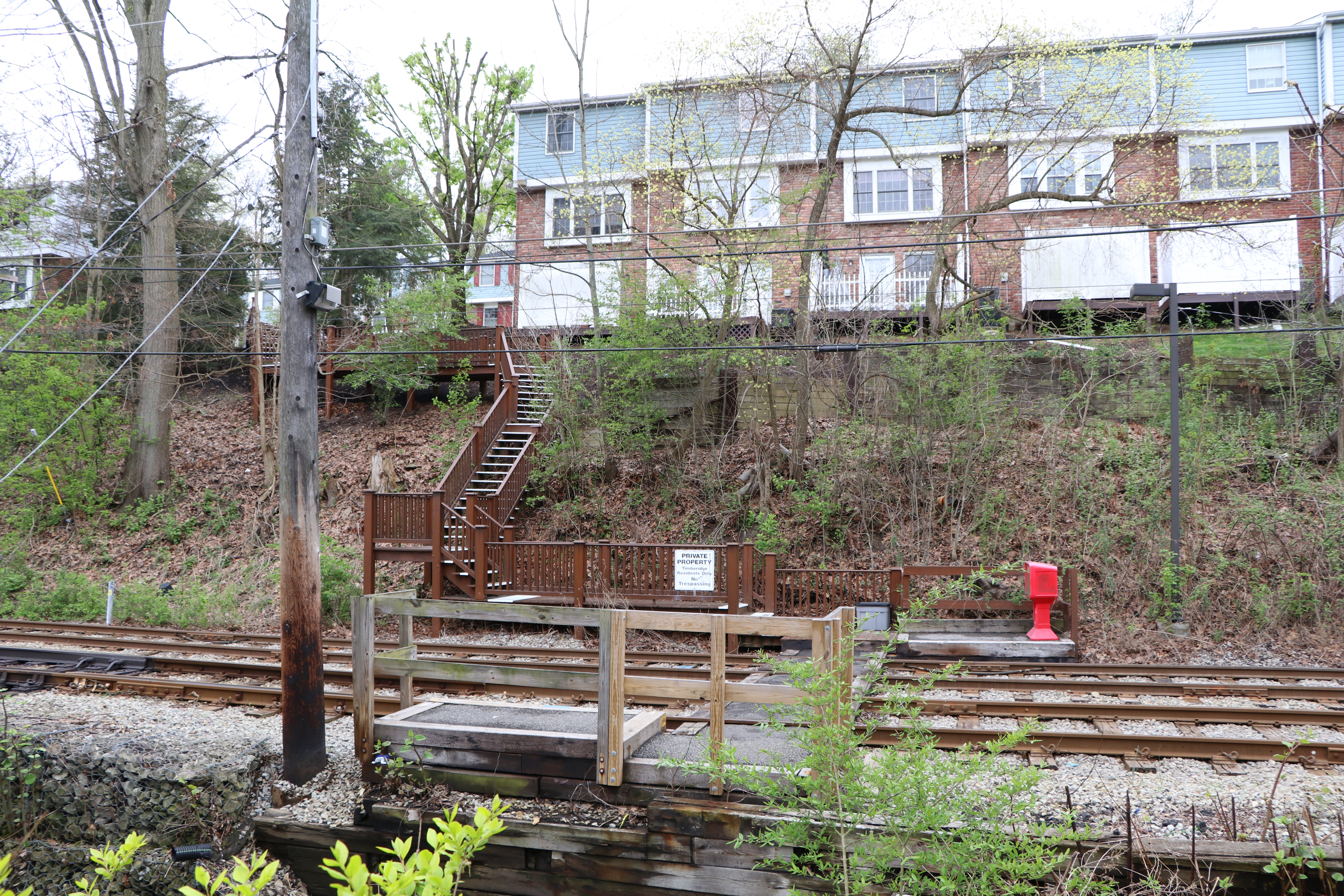
- Sandy Creek stop, the northbound platform is closest to the camera

General information
- Location: Library Road at Sandy Creek Apartments; Bethel Park, Pennsylvania
- Coordinates: 40.2963°N 80.0304°W
- Owner: Pittsburgh Regional Transit
- Line: Library Line
- Platforms: 2 side platforms
- Tracks: 2

Construction
- Structure type: At-grade
- Accessible: No

History
- Rebuilt: 1987

Passengers
- 2018: 26 (weekday boardings)

Services
Preceding station	Pittsburgh Regional Transit	Following station
Beagle toward Allegheny	Silver Line	West Library toward Library
Former services
Preceding station	Port Authority of Allegheny County	Following station
Leonard toward Gateway	47L Library via Overbrook	West Library toward Library
Location

Sandy Creek station is a stop on the Pittsburgh Light Rail network, operated by Pittsburgh Regional Transit, serving Bethel Park, Pennsylvania. It is a street-level stop consisting of two low-level side platforms for boarding and is not accessible.

The stop was added to serve the nearby Sandy Creek apartment complex, from which it takes its name. Pedestrian access is primarily from the Timberidge apartment complex on the opposite side of the line. Nearby residential development includes townhouses and condominiums built in proximity to the station.

Sandy Creek was originally among 13 stops proposed for discontinuation on June 25, 2012, as part of a service consolidation intended to reduce travel times. The closure was not implemented after it was determined that the approximately 1/2 mile (0.80 km) walk to the nearest remaining stop, West Library, would require crossing Library Road (Pennsylvania Route 88) and descending a steep grade.
