= Silver Line (Pittsburgh) =

Light rail line in Pittsburgh, Pennsylvania

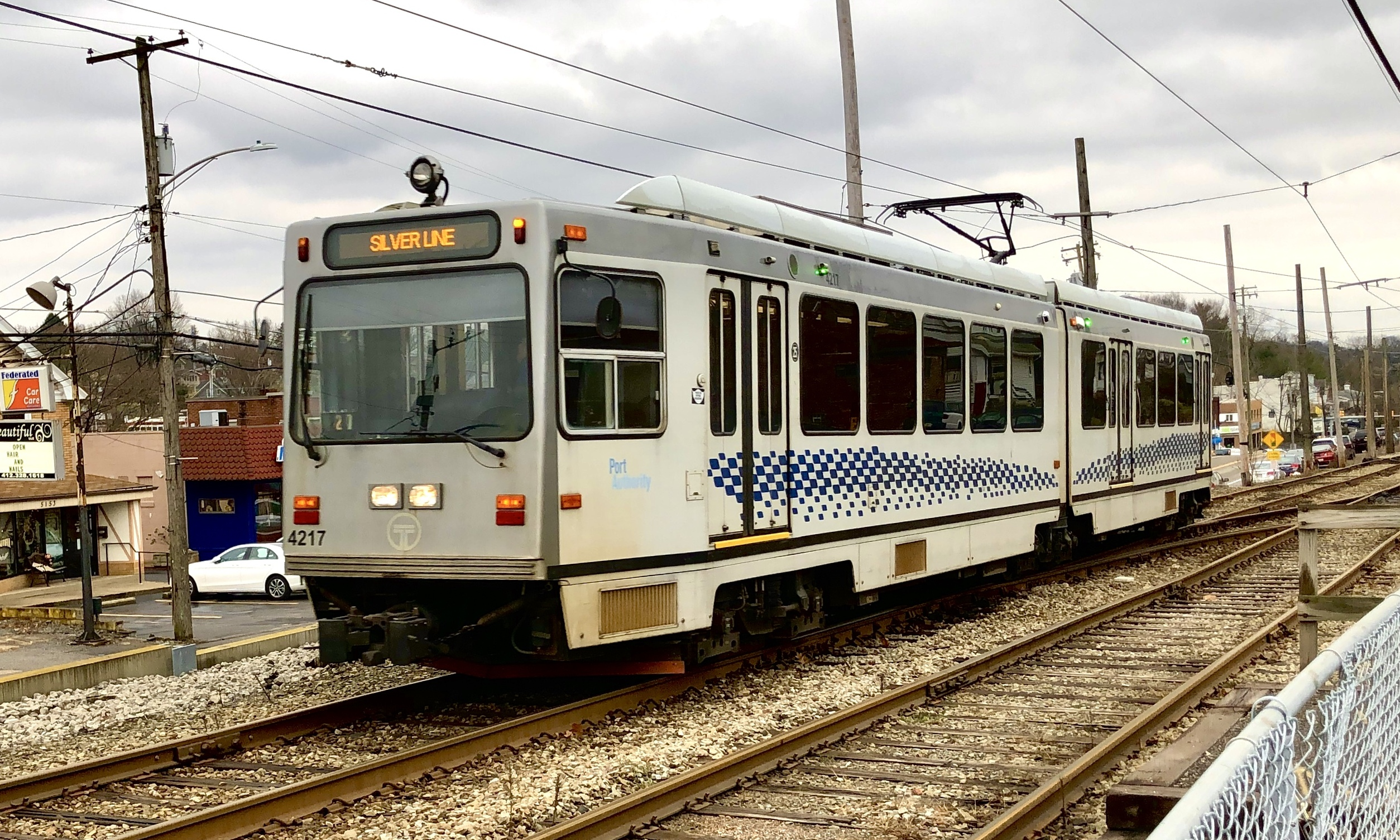
- Northbound Silver Line train near Mesta, December 2020

Overview
- Other name: 47L Library via Overbrook
- Owner: Pittsburgh Regional Transit
- Locale: Pittsburgh
- Termini: Allegheny; Library
- Stations: 31

Service
- Type: Light rail
- System: Pittsburgh Light Rail
- Depot(s): South Hills Village Rail Center
- Rolling stock: Siemens SD-400; CAF LRV
- Daily ridership: 4,861 (2025)

Technical
- Track gauge: 5 ft 2 1/2 in (1,588 mm) Pennsylvania trolley gauge
- Electrification: Overhead line, 650 V DC
Route map
Silver Line highlighted in silver
Key

The Silver Line is a Pittsburgh Light Rail line that operates between Pittsburgh's North Shore and Library, Pennsylvania via Downtown and the neighborhoods of Knoxville and Overbrook, as well as Castle Shannon and Bethel Park. The line is owned and operated by Pittsburgh Regional Transit.

== History ==
The line from South Hills Junction to Castle Shannon (now called the Overbrook Line) was first constructed by the Pittsburgh and Castle Shannon Railroad (P&CSRR) between 1872 and 1874. In 1905 Pittsburgh Railways leased the route and between 1909 and 1910 converted it from narrow gauge to dual gauge and installed overhead power for trolleys. South of Washington Junction the line split into two branches, one going southwest towards Washington, Pennsylvania (a portion of which remains as part of the current Red Line), and the other south towards Finleyville, Pennsylvania, later extended to Monongahela with two further branches to Donora and Charleroi, respectively, the latter would be later extended to Roscoe.

In 1953, the Roscoe and Donora branches were eliminated, and the trunk line to Monongahela was cut back to the current terminus in Library. This route was designated as 35 Shannon-Library by Pittsburgh Railways Company, and redesignated as 47L Library via Overbrook by successor Port Authority in the 1980s during the Stage I reconstruction of the streetcar system into light rail. In 1988, a derailment forced the Port Authority to retire all of the PCC cars that had not been rebuilt into the 4000-series, leaving only the twelve 4000 PCC's and four "Super 17's" available to serve the Overbrook, Library, and Drake lines, thus necessitating the use of LRV's on at least one of these lines to maintain service. Of the three, the Library line was found to be the best suited to accommodate the larger LRV's with only minor modifications, and the route was modified and redesignated in December, 1988 as the "42L Library via Beechview", which, as the name states, originates on the Library branch, but transverses the Beechview corridor between Castle Shannon and South Hills Junction, as the Overbrook corridor could not accommodate the LRV's.

Between 1999 and 2004, Port Authority undertook a complete reconstruction of the deteriorated Overbrook corridor. During this time, the Lytle stop along the Library branch was rebuilt into a high level platform station, and the terminal of the branch was rebuilt. South of West Library, the stops at Hicks and Pleasant Street were eliminated, and Simmons was replaced with the current Library Station.

The Overbrook corridor was reopened on June 2, 2004, following major work which included doubling of the track and elimination of 22 traditional street level trolley stops in favor of eight new LRV style stations with platforms. At this time, the 42L route was reverted to the 47L to serve the rebuilt line.

The Port Authority closed five stations along the Library branch on June 25, 2012: Martin Villa, Mine 3, Lindermer, Center and Latimer. Other former Library branch stops that were closed include Latimer, Logan, and Leonard. As part of the Authority's new color-coding route system, the 47L was redesignated as Blue Line - Library.

On March 15, 2020, the Library branch of the Blue Line was renamed the Silver Line.

== Route ==
From north to south, the line begins at the elevated Allegheny station on the North Shore, before heading underground to North Side and proceeding beneath the Allegheny River. It continues through Downtown Pittsburgh, stopping at Gateway, Wood Street, and Steel Plaza, before surfacing at First Avenue.

Leaving downtown, the line crosses the Monongahela River via the Panhandle Bridge, stopping at Station Square, and then passes through the Mount Washington Transit Tunnel to South Hills Junction, where the Red Line diverges and the former Brown Line once branched off to serve the Allentown neighborhood. The Blue and Silver Line then continue south along a modern light rail alignment through the Beltzhoover, Bon Air, Carrick, Brookline, and Overbrook neighborhoods, serving Boggs, Bon Air, Denise, South Bank, McNeilly, Killarney, and Memorial Hall, all of which are accessible stations.

At Willow station in Bethel Park, the Red Line rejoins, having reached the area via the Beechview neighborhood. The three lines continue through stops at St. Anne's and Smith Road before reaching Washington Junction, where the Red and Blue lines diverges toward South Hills Village. The Silver Line continues to Library, with intermediate stops at Hillcrest, Lytle, Mesta, South Park, Munroe, Sarah, Logan, King's School, Beagle, Sandy Creek, and West Library.

== Station list ==
The Pittsburgh Light Rail has three types of stations. They are low platform, high platform, and underground. High platform and underground stations are wheelchair accessible as the train doors are level with the platform. Low platform stations are not wheelchair accessible as they require passengers to climb stairs to board the light rail vehicle.

Name	Miles	Disabled access	Type	Other services	City (Neighborhood)
Allegheny	0.00	Disabled access	high platform	Blue Red	Pittsburgh (Chateau)
North Side	0.51	Disabled access	underground	Blue Red	Pittsburgh (North Shore)
Gateway	1.00	Disabled access	underground	Blue Red	Pittsburgh (Downtown)
Wood Street	1.26	Disabled access	underground	Blue Red	Pittsburgh (Downtown)
Steel Plaza	1.55	Disabled access	underground	Blue Red	Pittsburgh (Downtown)
First Avenue	1.88	Disabled access	high platform	Blue Red	Pittsburgh (Downtown)
Station Square	2.41	Disabled access	high platform	Blue Red South Busway; Monongahela Incline	Pittsburgh (South Shore)
South Hills Junction	3.25	Disabled access	high platform	Blue Red South Busway	Pittsburgh (Mt. Washington)
Boggs	3.66	Disabled access	high platform	Blue	Pittsburgh (Beltzhoover)
Bon Air	4.30	Disabled access	high platform	Blue	Pittsburgh (Bon Air)
Denise	5.09	Disabled access	high platform	Blue	Pittsburgh (Carrick)
South Bank	5.49	Disabled access	high platform	Blue South Busway	Pittsburgh (Overbrook)
McNeilly	6.73	Disabled access	high platform	Blue	Baldwin Township
Killarney	7.06	Disabled access	high platform	Blue	Castle Shannon
Memorial Hall	7.76	Disabled access	high platform	Blue	Castle Shannon
Willow	8.31	Disabled access	high platform	Blue	Castle Shannon
St. Anne's	8.69		low platform	Blue Red	Castle Shannon
Smith Road	8.97	#	low platform	Blue Red	Castle Shannon
Washington Junction	9.21	Disabled access	high platform	Blue Red	Bethel Park
Hillcrest	9.77		low platform		Bethel Park
Lytle	10.64	Disabled access	high platform		Bethel Park
Mesta	10.82		low platform		Bethel Park
South Park	11.03		low platform		Bethel Park
Munroe	11.38		low platform		Bethel Park
Sarah	11.90		low platform		Bethel Park
Logan	12.23		low platform		Bethel Park
King's School	12.46		low platform		Bethel Park
Beagle	12.99		low platform		Bethel Park
Sandy Creek	13.26		low platform		Bethel Park
West Library	13.45	Disabled access	high platform		Bethel Park
Library	14.13	Disabled access	high platform		South Park
