= Martin Villa station =

Martin Villa
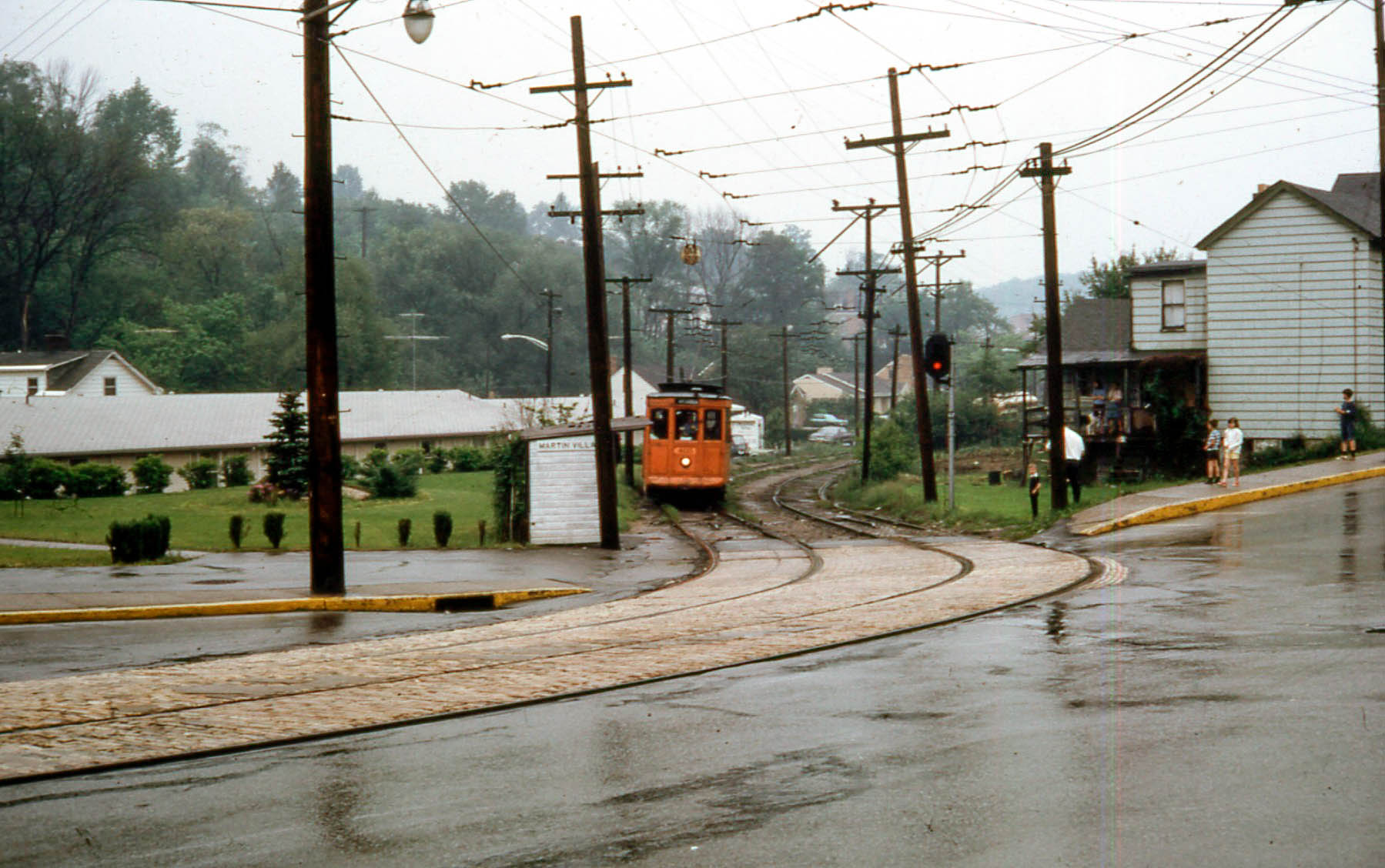
- The station in 1968

General information
- Location: Willow Avenue at Baldwin Avenue, Castle Shannon, Pennsylvania
- Coordinates: 40.3634°N 80.0284°W
- Owner: Port Authority
- Tracks: 2

Construction
- Structure type: street level

History
- Opened: May 22, 1987
- Closed: June 25, 2012

Former services
Preceding station	Port Authority of Allegheny County	Following station
Willow toward Allegheny	Blue Line Library	St. Anne's toward Library
Willow toward Allegheny	Blue Line South Hills Village via Overbrook	St. Anne's toward South Hills Village
Overbrook Junction toward Allegheny	Red Line South Hills Village via Beechview	St. Anne's toward South Hills Village
Castle Shannon Terminus	47D Drake 1993–1999	St. Anne's toward Drake
Municipal Building toward Gateway	47D Drake 1984–1993	St. Anne's toward Drake
Location

Martin Villa was a station on the Port Authority of Allegheny County's light rail network, located in Castle Shannon, Pennsylvania. The street level stop was incorporated into the system to serve an apartment complex of the same name. On the opposite side of the street, a variety of residences were within walking distance.

Martin Villa was one of eleven stops closed on June 25, 2012, as part of a system-wide consolidation effort.

== History ==
The stop dated back to the PCC streetcar era, being at the transition between center street and off street reserved right of way.
