= Beagle station =

Rail station in Bethel Park, Pennsylvania, U.S.

Beagle
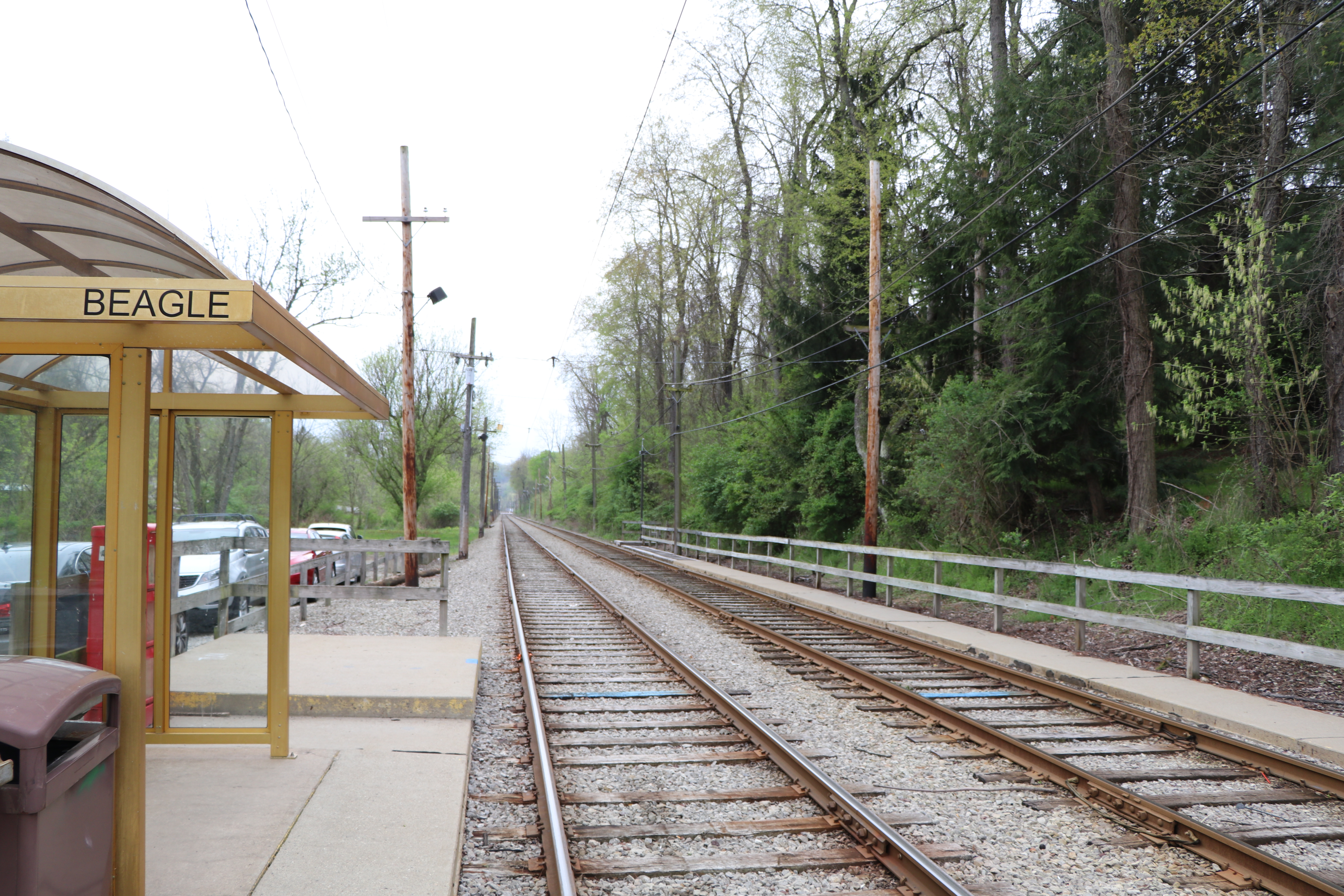
- Looking south

General information
- Location: Library Road at Beagle Drive; Bethel Park, Pennsylvania
- Coordinates: 40.3009°N 80.0314°W
- Owner: Pittsburgh Regional Transit
- Line: Library Line
- Platforms: 2 side platforms
- Tracks: 2

Construction
- Structure type: At-grade
- Accessible: No

History
- Rebuilt: 1987

Passengers
- 2018: 26 (weekday boardings)

Services
Preceding station	Pittsburgh Regional Transit	Following station
King's School toward Allegheny	Silver Line	Sandy Creek toward Library
Former services
Preceding station	Port Authority of Allegheny County	Following station
King's School toward Gateway	47L Library via Overbrook	Leonard toward Library
Location

Beagle station is a stop on the Pittsburgh Light Rail network, operated by Pittsburgh Regional Transit, serving Bethel Park, Pennsylvania. It is a small, street-level stop used by local residents traveling to and from Downtown Pittsburgh. The station consists of two low-level side platforms for street-level boarding and is not accessible.
