= West Library station =

Light railway station in South Park, Pennsylvania, U.S.

West Library
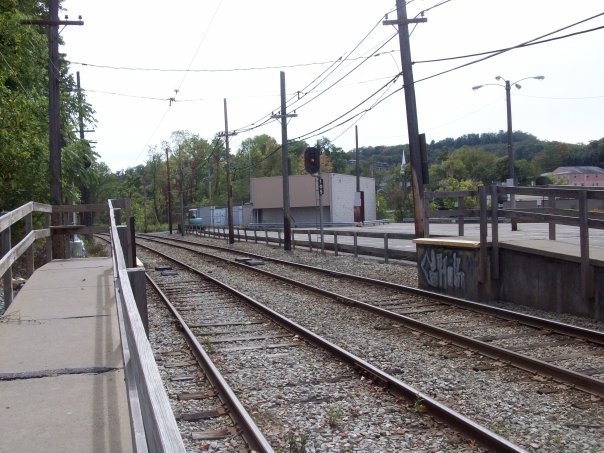
- West Library station, looking south from the northbound platform, October 2009

General information
- Location: Library Road at Clifton Road; Bethel Park, Pennsylvania
- Coordinates: 40.2942°N 80.0299°W
- Owner: Pittsburgh Regional Transit
- Line: Library Line
- Platforms: 2 side platforms
- Tracks: 2
- Connections: MMVTA: A

Construction
- Structure type: At-grade
- Parking: 115 spaces
- Accessible: Yes

History
- Opened: September 12, 1903
- Rebuilt: 1987

Passengers
- 2018: 154 (weekday boardings)

Services
Preceding station	Pittsburgh Regional Transit	Following station
Sandy Creek toward Allegheny	Silver Line	Library Terminus
Former services
Preceding station	Port Authority of Allegheny County	Following station
Sandy Creek toward Gateway	47L Library via Overbrook	Hicks toward Library
Location

Hillcrest station is a station on the Pittsburgh Light Rail network, operated by Pittsburgh Regional Transit, serving the Library neighborhood in Bethel Park, Pennsylvania. It has two high-level side platforms for level boarding and is accessible. The station functions as a park and ride facility with 115 spaces.

== History ==
A stop was established at West Library when the Pittsburgh Railways interurban line from Charleroi to Pittsburgh opened through South Park on September 12, 1903. Passengers initially transferred at Castle Shannon to continue to Downtown via the Pittsburgh and Castle Shannon Railroad.

The line was cut back to Library in 1953. It was later converted from PCC streetcar operation to light rail in 1993.
