= Mine 3 station =

Railway station in Bethel Park, Pennsylvania, U.S.

Mine 3
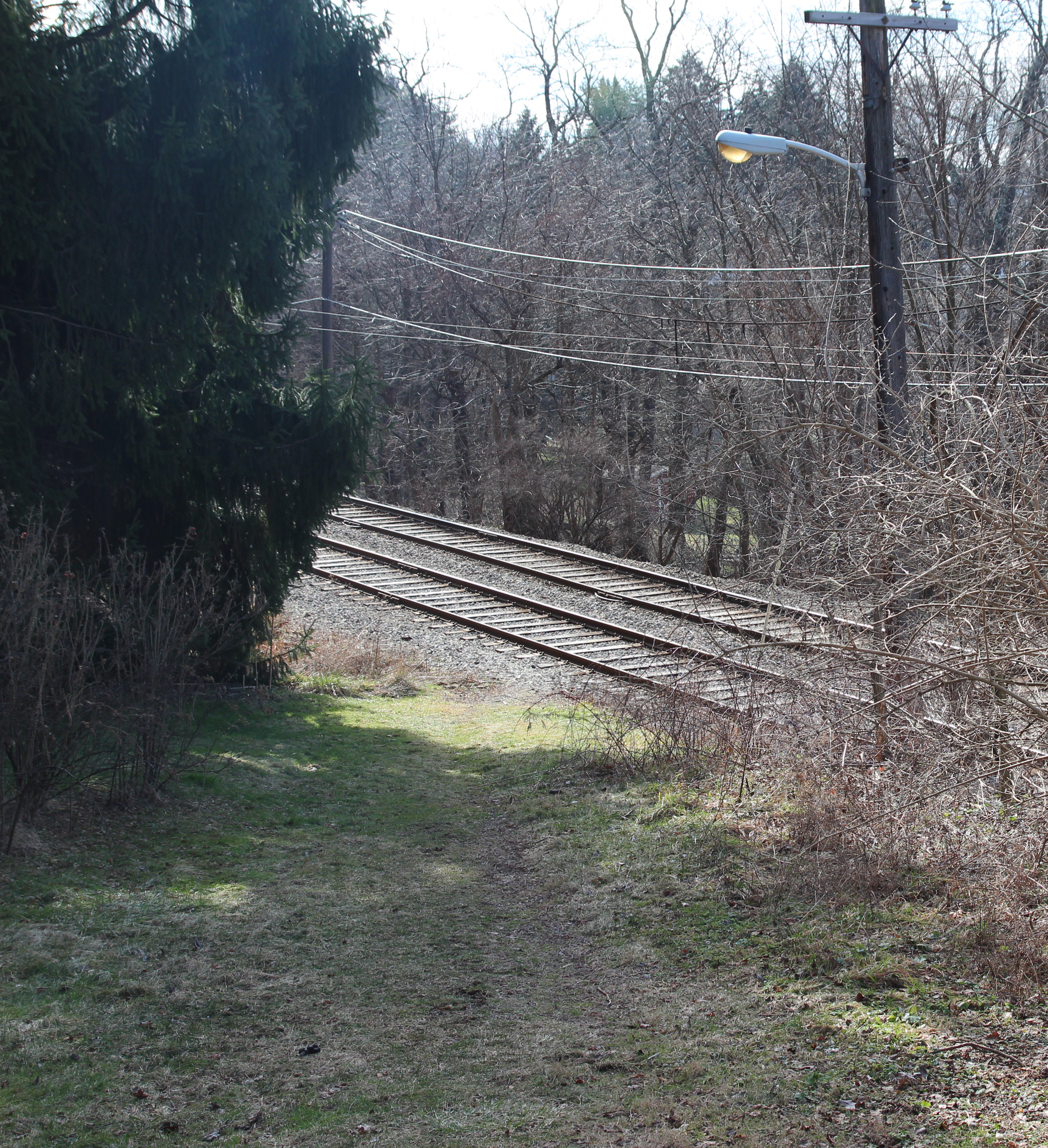
- The station site in 2017. Nothing remains of the former station.

General information
- Location: Fifth Street at Railroad Street; Bethel Park, Pennsylvania
- Coordinates: 40.3489°N 80.0290°W
- Owner: Port Authority
- Tracks: 2

History
- Opened: 1903
- Closed: June 25, 2012
- Rebuilt: –May 22, 1987

Former services
Preceding station	Port Authority of Allegheny County	Following station
Washington Junction toward Allegheny	Blue Line Library	Hillcrest toward Library
Location

Mine 3 was a station on the Port Authority of Allegheny County's light rail network, located in Bethel Park, Pennsylvania. The small station was located directly adjacent to an industrial park and was designed mainly to provide access for workers at the associated businesses.

== History ==
The station's name is a historical reference to a coal mine that was once operated on the site of the current industrial area. Pittsburgh Terminal No. 3 Mine (Mollenaur / Mollenauer Mine) was opened by the Pittsburgh Terminal Railroad & Coal Company in 1903 and still producing coal in 1938. This mine played a significant role in the development of the local economy, contributing to the growth of Bethel Park and surrounding communities.

Mine 3 was one of eleven stops closed on June 25, 2012, as part of a system-wide consolidation effort.
