= Port Authority 4000-series PCC =

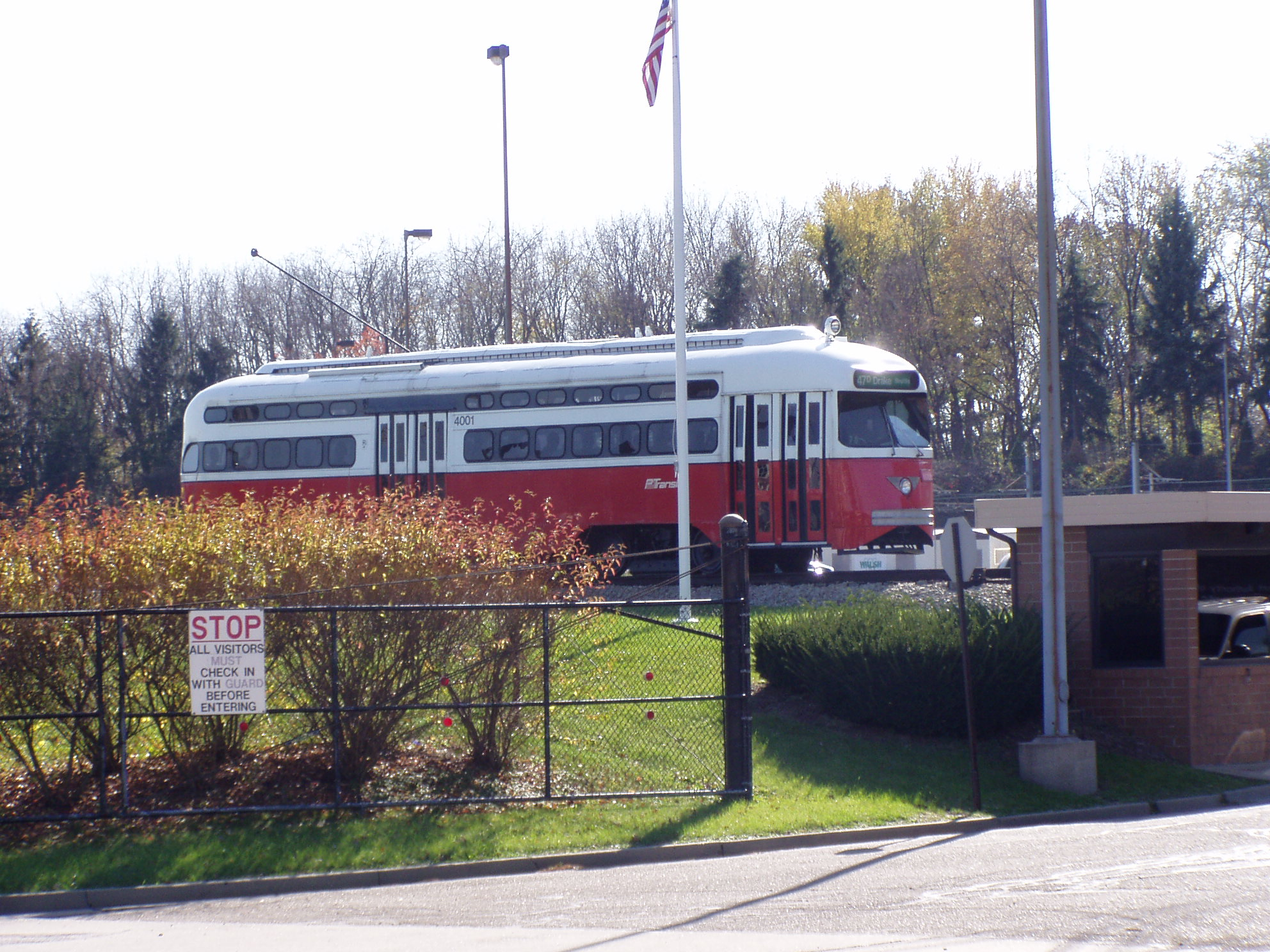
- PCC 4001 on static display at the South Hills Village depot, 2004
- Manufacturers: St. Louis Car Company, rebuilt by Port Authority's South Hills Junction car shops
- Constructed: 1949
- Refurbished: 1981–1988
- Number built: 12 + 4 partial rebuilds
- Number preserved: 7
- Number scrapped: 5
- Fleet numbers: 4001–4012, 1713, 1735, 1737, 1765
- Capacity: 46 seated; 134 max. including standees
- Operator: Port Authority of Allegheny County
- Depot: South Hills Village
- Line served: Pittsburgh Light Rail

Specifications
- Car length: 46 ft 6 in (14.17 m)
- Width: 8 ft (2.44 m)
- Height: 10 ft (3.05 m)
- Doors: 2
- Weight: Empty: 37,400 lb (17,000 kg); Full: 53,000 lb (24,000 kg)
- Traction system: 4 × 48 hp (36 kW) continuous, 55 hp (41 kW) maximum
- Acceleration: 4.3 mph/s (1.9 m/s^{2})
- Deceleration: Service: 3.6 mph/s (1.6 m/s^{2}); Emergency: 9 mph/s (4.0 m/s^{2})
- Electric systems: Overhead line, 600 V DC
- Current collection: Pantograph
- Track gauge: 5 ft 2 1/2 in (1,588 mm) Pennsylvania trolley gauge

The 4000-series PCC was a rebuilt PCC streetcar used by the Port Authority of Allegheny County. Originally designed by the Presidents' Conference Committee, a group of transit operators in the United States and Canada, the 4000's were a series of PCC cars completely rebuilt from cars built in 1949 by the St. Louis Car Company for Port Authority's predecessor, Pittsburgh Railways.

== Background ==
In the early 1980s, the Port Authority of Allegheny County began its Stage I project to rebuild portions of its streetcar system into the Pittsburgh Light Rail, including the Beechview–South Hills Village line and the acquisition of 55 Siemens SD-400 light rail vehicles. This phase covered only part of the network and the Overbrook–Library and Drake corridors were could not accommodate the larger, heavier LRVs. To maintain service, the authority rebuilt a portion of its PCC fleet. Plans to overhaul 45 cars from the 1700 series were reduced to 12 due to budget and technical constraints.

The resulting 4000-series cars incorporated new propulsion and braking systems, updated wiring and interiors, and other structural modifications using components from the original vehicles. Some cars were equipped with dual pantographs, including one fitted with a de-icing apparatus, while only one car (4006) received air conditioning.

=== Super 17s ===
In addition to the fully rebuilt 4000-series cars, the agency also did less extensive refurbishments to four additional 1700-series cars, which were informally known as the "Super 17s". These cars (1713, 1735, 1737 and 1765) received updated mechanical and electrical systems and refurbished interiors, but retained features such as original lighting, steel body panels, and operator controls, as well as their original fleet numbers.

== Service ==
The 4000 series was intended as an interim solution for the Authority's unrebuilt lines, which could not accommodate the newer, heavier railcars. They were assigned to the routes that used these lines: 47 Shannon, 47D Drake via Overbrook, 47L Library via Overbrook, and 47S South Hills Village via Overbrook.

In 1988, Port Authority retired all of its remaining un-rebuilt PCC's due to safety concerns, leaving only the twelve 4000 PCC's and four "Super 17's" available to serve the Overbrook, Library, and Drake lines, thus necessitating the use of LRV's on at least one of these lines to maintain service. Of the three, the Library line was found to be the best suited to accommodate the larger LRV's with only minor modifications, and the route was modified and redesignated as 42L Library via Beechview in December 1988, and the PCC's were relegated to just the 47, 47D and 47S lines.

Unlike the LRV's which had both high and low level doors, the PCC's had only low level doors and were limited to street level boarding. As a result, all major stations on portions of the system that were shared by PCC's and LRV's (South Hills Village, Washington Junction, Castle Shannon, South Hills Junction, and all stops north of the Mount Washington Transit Tunnel) had both high and low platforms to accommodate both types of cars.

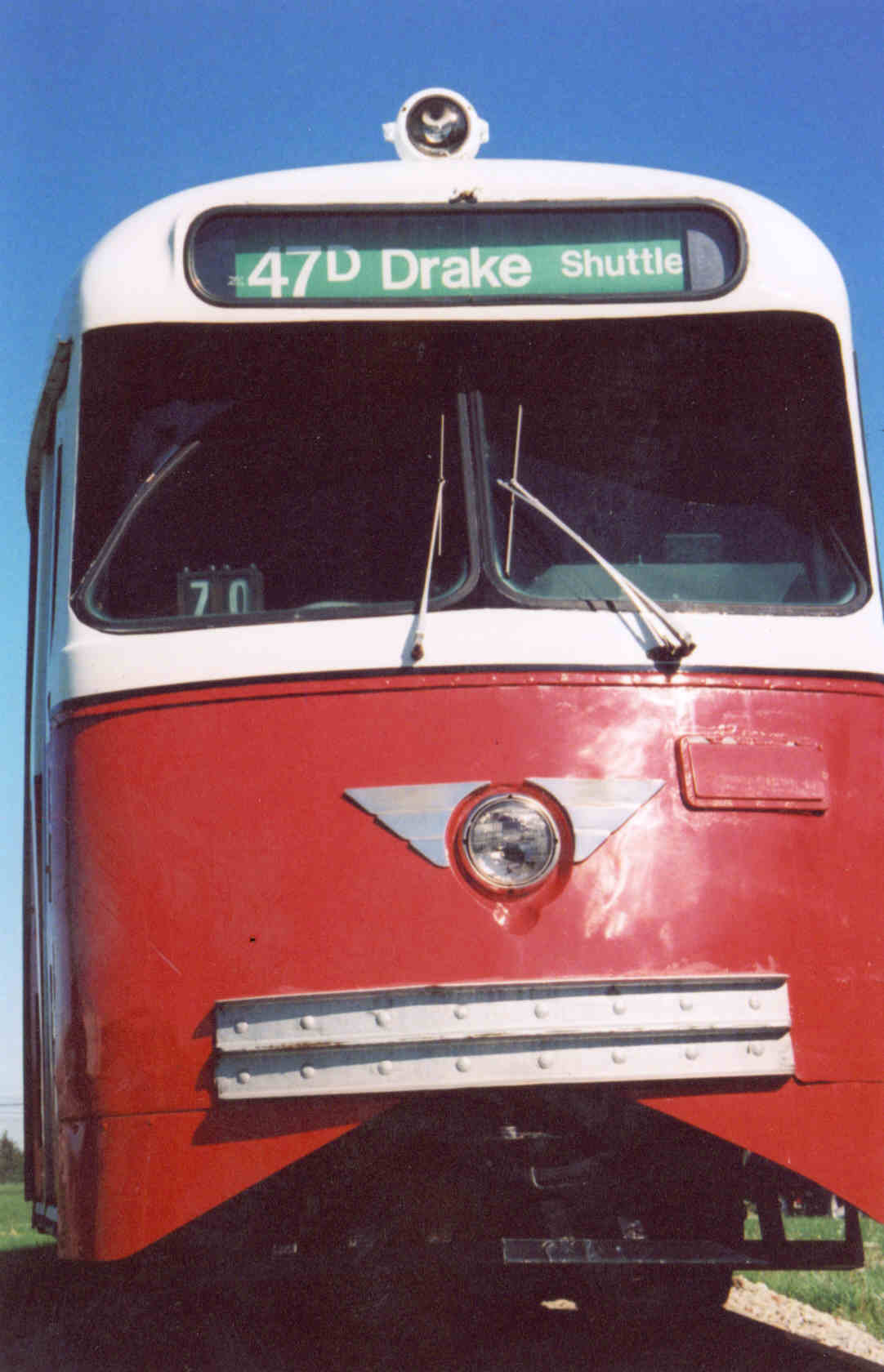
4001 on 47D Drake shuttle

In 1993, the Overbrook Line was shut down between Castle Shannon and South Hills Junction due to the deteriorated conditions of the track, bridges, walls, and other infrastructure. Route 47 and 47S were suspended, and the 47D was reduced to a short shuttle between Drake and Castle Shannon, where riders could transfer to the 42L, 42S South Hills Village via Beechview, or a bus to continue to downtown.

In 1999, the 47D shuttle was shut down, and the remaining PCC's were retired.

Roster
No.	Notes
4000	Ex-1702, rebuilt 1981. Renumbered 4012 in 1985.
4001	Ex-1720, rebuilt 1981.
4002	Ex-1740, rebuilt 1981.
4003	Ex-1731, rebuilt 1981.
4004	Ex-1739, rebuilt 1981.
4005	Ex-1729, rebuilt 1981.
4006	Ex-1767, rebuilt 1981.
4007	Ex-1719, rebuilt 1981.
4008	Ex-1709, rebuilt 1981.
4009	Ex-1700, rebuilt 1981.
4010	Ex-1757, rebuilt 1981.
4011	Ex-1733, rebuilt 1981.
4013	Ex-1762, rebuilt 1987.

=== Preserved examples ===
Car #4004 was donated to the Pennsylvania Trolley Museum, where it is preserved as part of a collection of historic streetcars.

The San Francisco Municipal Railway acquired cars #4008 and #4009 at auction in 2002 for a total of US$10,000 (equivalent to $17,900 in 2025). However, the agency did not restore the cars due to differences from its existing PCC fleet, including gauge incompatibility and the need for modifications to meet the Americans with Disabilities Act of 1990. By 2018, after extended outdoor storage and deterioration, the cars were approved for disposal and scrapped the following year. Muni instead repainted PCC car 1062, originally Philadelphia Transportation Company (later SEPTA) no. 2101, in Pittsburgh Railways livery.

The disposition of the remainder are as follows:

- 4001: On static display at South Hills Village depot
- 4002: Under restoration at Pikes Peak Trolley Museum in Colorado Springs
- 4006: Under restoration at the American Industrial Mining Co. Museum in Cleveland
- 4007: On static display near South Park station
- 4011: Privately owned, Buckeye Lake, Ohio (derelict)
- 4012 (ex-4000): Privately owned, Buckeye Lake, Ohio (derelict)
- "Super 17" 1713: Preserved in operating condition at the Pennsylvania Trolley Museum, restored in its early 1980s Pittsburgh Steelers "Terrible Trolley" livery

== See also ==
- Pittsburgh Light Rail
- 47D Drake
- PCC streetcar
- SEPTA PCC III
- Siemens SD-400 and SD-460
