= Lytle station =

Lytle
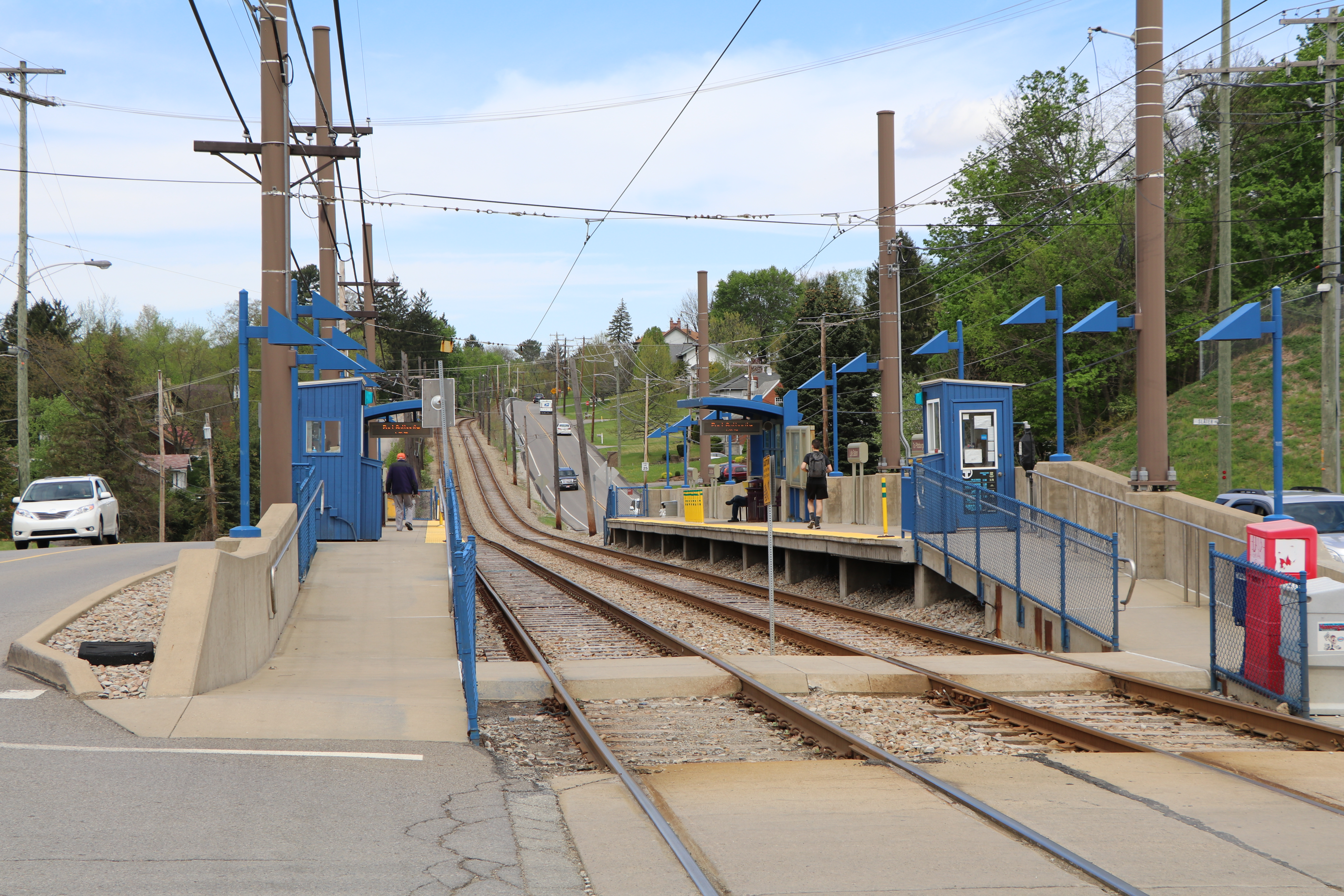
- Looking north

General information
- Location: Brightwood Road at Lytle Road; Bethel Park, Pennsylvania
- Coordinates: 40.3342°N 80.0311°W
- Owner: Pittsburgh Regional Transit
- Line: Library Line
- Platforms: 2 side platforms
- Tracks: 2

Construction
- Structure type: At-grade
- Parking: 286 spaces
- Accessible: Yes

History
- Opened: 1987
- Rebuilt: 2004

Passengers
- 2018: 453 (weekday boardings)

Services
Preceding station	Pittsburgh Regional Transit	Following station
Hillcrest toward Allegheny	Silver Line	Mesta toward Library
Former services
Preceding station	Port Authority of Allegheny County	Following station
Center Closed 2012 toward Allegheny	Blue Line Library	Mesta toward Library
Location

Lytle station is a station on the Pittsburgh Light Rail network, operated by Pittsburgh Regional Transit, serving Bethel Park, Pennsylvania. It has two high-level side platforms for level boarding and is accessible. The station functions as a park-and-ride facility with 286 spaces. Many nearby residences are within walking distance, providing local access to service to and from Downtown Pittsburgh.

== History ==
Lytle was originally a street level stop but reopened as a high-level platform park-and-ride station in 2004.

An old Montour Railroad trestle, the Summit Park Bridge, was located over the Lytle stop. It was removed in 1993, 17 years after the last train ran across the bridge.
