= Willow station (Pittsburgh) =

PAT station

Willow
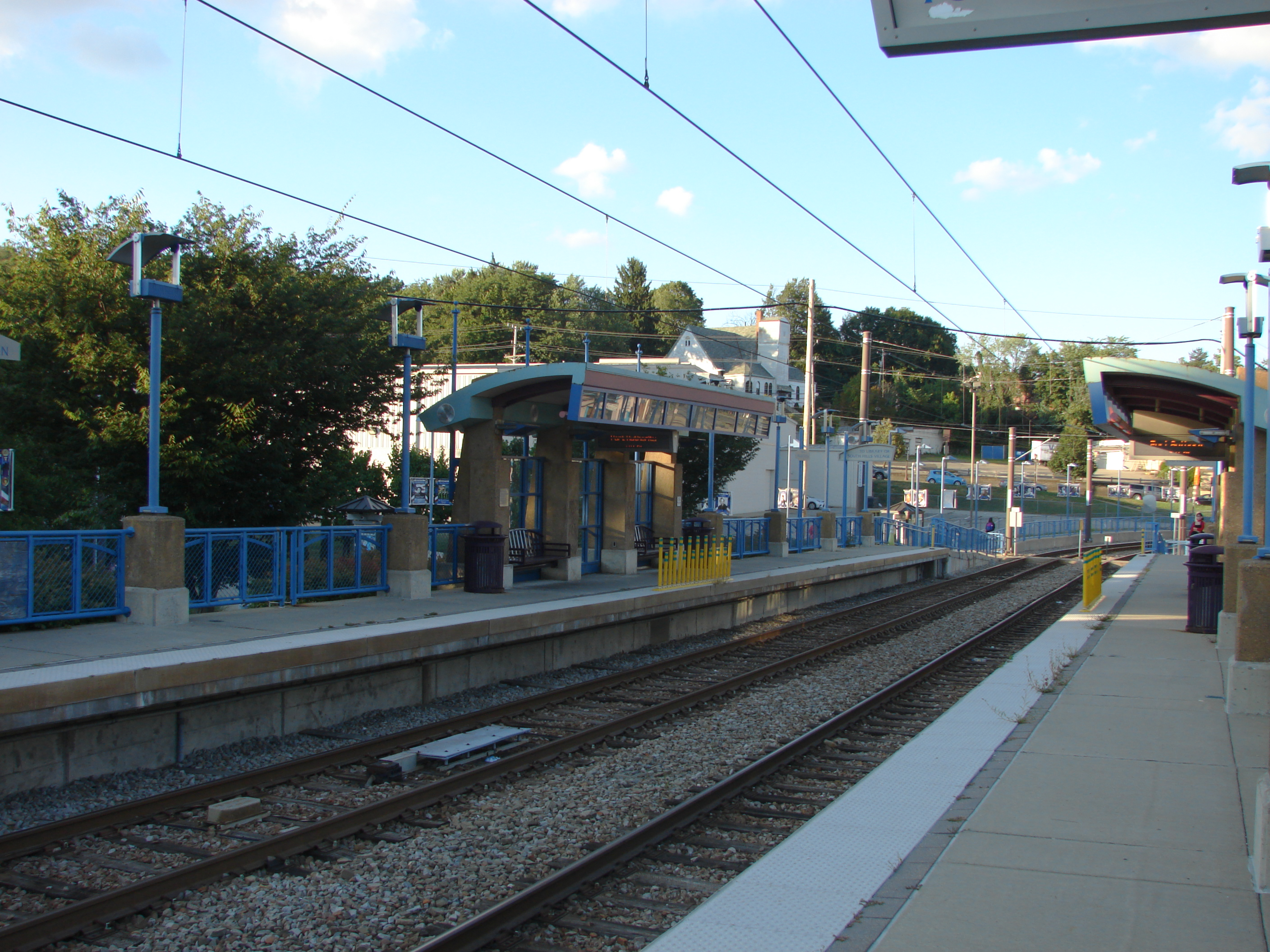
- Willow station platforms, August 2015

General information
- Location: Willow Avenue and James Street; Castle Shannon, Pennsylvania
- Coordinates: 40.3654°N 80.0264°W
- Owner: Pittsburgh Regional Transit
- Line: Overbrook Line
- Platforms: 2 side platforms
- Tracks: 2
- Connections: Red at Overbrook Junction

Construction
- Structure type: At-grade
- Accessible: Yes

History
- Opened: June 2, 2004

Passengers
- 2018: 315 (weekday boardings)

Services
Preceding station	Pittsburgh Regional Transit	Following station
Memorial Hall toward Allegheny	Blue Line	St. Anne's toward South Hills Village
Memorial Hall toward Allegheny	Silver Line	St. Anne's toward Library
Former services
Preceding station	Port Authority of Allegheny County	Following station
Memorial Hall toward Allegheny	Blue Line South Hills Village via Overbrook	Martin Villa Closed 2012 toward South Hills Village
Memorial Hall toward Allegheny	Blue Line Library	Martin Villa Closed 2012 toward Library
Location

Willow station is a station on the Pittsburgh Light Rail network, operated by Pittsburgh Regional Transit, serving Baldwin Township, Pennsylvania. It has two high-level side platforms for level boarding and is accessible. It is a transfer point between the Red Line at Overbrook Junction (serving Castle Shannon, Mt. Lebanon, Dormont, and Beechview) and the Blue and Silver Lines (serving Overbrook, Carrick, Bon Air, Bethel Park and Library). The station's name was derived from Willow Avenue, the street that runs parallel with and across the light rail. No parking is available at the site and because park and ride commuters can more conveniently reach the nearby Memorial Hall station, Willow almost exclusively serves nearby apartments and individuals switching trains.

== History ==
Willow was opened in 2004, one of eight new platform equipped stations which replaced 33 streetcar style stops along the Overbrook branch.
