= Center station =

Center
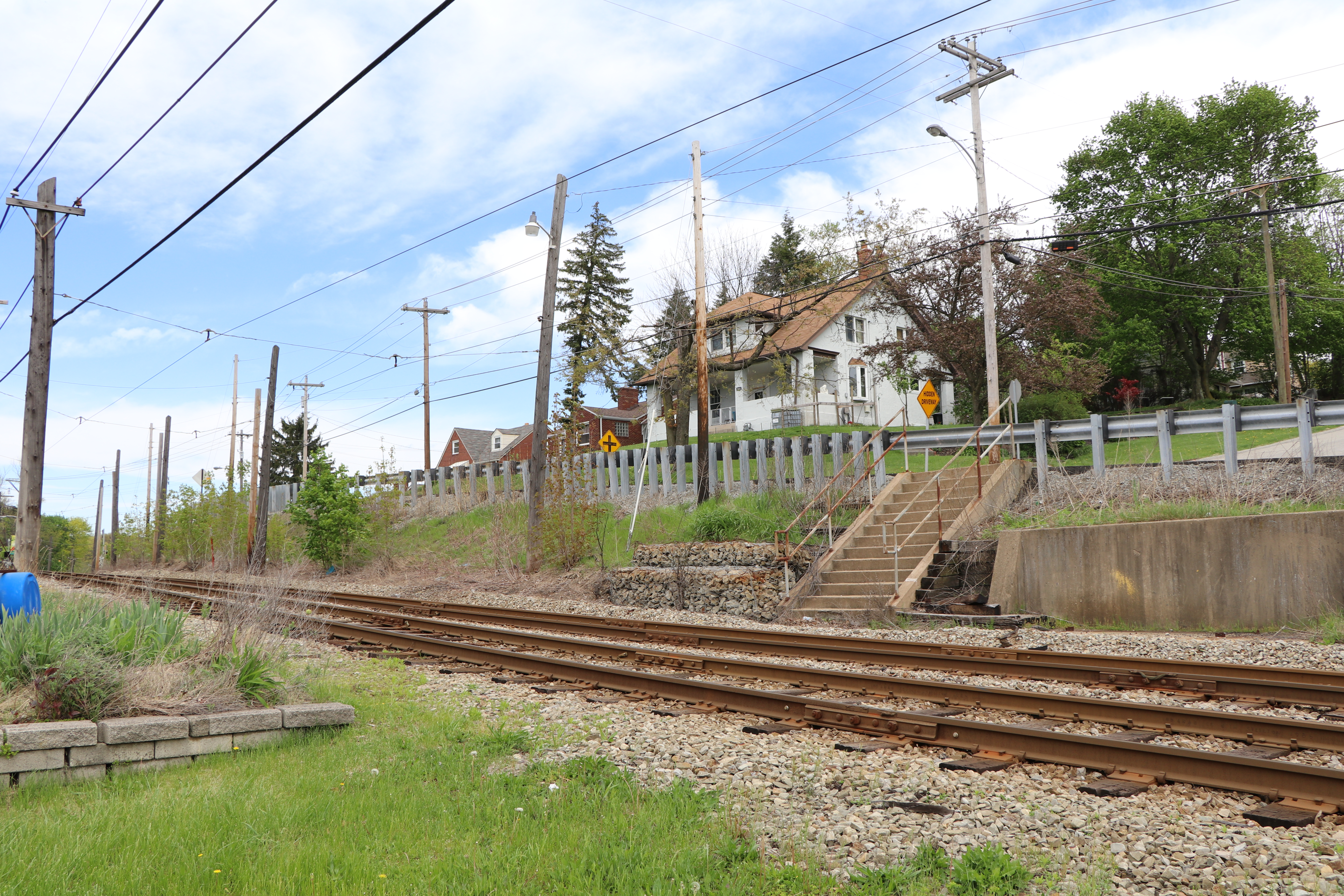
- Station site in 2017. Only a staircase remains.

General information
- Location: Brightwood Road at Center Street, Bethel Park, Pennsylvania
- Coordinates: 40.3371°N 80.0313°W
- Owner: Port Authority
- Tracks: 2

Construction
- Structure type: street level

History
- Closed: June 25, 2012
- Rebuilt: –May 22, 1987

Former services
Preceding station	Port Authority of Allegheny County	Following station
Lindermer toward Allegheny	Blue Line Library	Lytle toward Library
Location

Center was a station on the Port Authority of Allegheny County's light rail network, located in Bethel Park, Pennsylvania. The street level stop was designed as a small commuter stop, serving area residents who walked to the train so they could be taken toward Downtown Pittsburgh.

Center was one of eleven stops closed on June 25, 2012 as part of a system-wide consolidation effort.
