= Library, Pennsylvania =

- Unincorporated community
- Nickname: Loafer's Hollow
- Interactive map of Library, Pennsylvania
- Coordinates: 40.2898°N 80.0098°W
- Country: United States
- State: Pennsylvania
- County: Allegheny
- Township: South Park
- Time zone: UTC-5 (EST)
  - Summer (DST): UTC-4 (EDT)

Library is an unincorporated community in South Park Township, Pennsylvania along Brownsville Road. Originally known as Loafer's Hollow, it was renamed Library by its residents in honor of the first library in the area, founded by John Moore in 1833. South of Library, the original course of Brownsville Road continues as Pennsylvania Route 88. Library holds an annual Memorial Day parade and ceremony.

== Transportation ==
Library is served by the Library station on the Port Authority of Allegheny County's light rail network's Silver Line.

== Notable people ==
- Jerry G. Beck Jr., US Army brigadier general
