= Washington Junction station =

Pittsburgh Light Rail station

Washington Junction
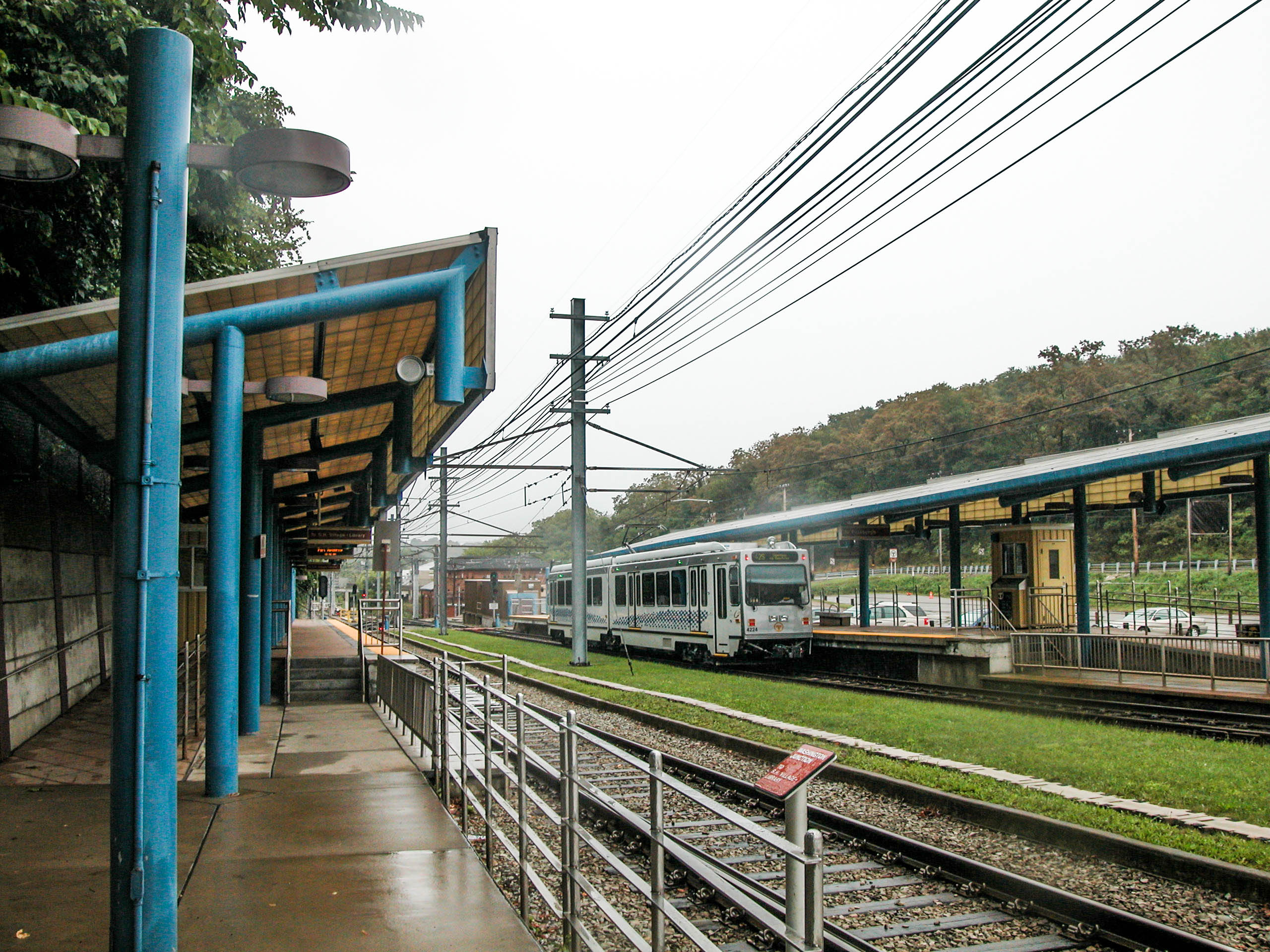
- Washington Junction station, looking north

General information
- Location: Library Road at Milford Road; Bethel Park, Pennsylvania
- Coordinates: 40.3535°N 80.0272°W
- Owner: Pittsburgh Regional Transit
- Platforms: 2 side platforms
- Tracks: 2
- Connections: MMVTA: A

Construction
- Structure type: At-grade
- Parking: 230 spaces
- Accessible: Yes

History
- Opened: 1903
- Rebuilt: 1984

Passengers
- 2018: 714 (weekday boardings)

Services
Preceding station	Pittsburgh Regional Transit	Following station
Smith Road toward Allegheny	Blue Line	Casswell toward South Hills Village
Smith Road toward Allegheny	Red Line	Casswell toward South Hills Village
Smith Road toward Allegheny	Silver Line	Hillcrest toward Library
Former services
Preceding station	Port Authority of Allegheny County	Following station
Smith Road toward Allegheny	Blue Line Library	Mine 3 Closed 2012 toward Library
Smith Road toward Gateway	47D Drake 1984–1993	Casswell toward Drake
Location

Washington Junction is a station on Pittsburgh Regional Transit's light rail network. It is located in Bethel Park, Pennsylvania. The facility is designed both as a transfer station for southbound travelers (the Red and Blue Lines continue toward Upper St. Clair and South Hills Village, while the Silver Line continues toward South Park and Library), and as a commuter park and ride facility. 230 spaces are located on site, designed for allowing travel to Downtown Pittsburgh by residents of northern Bethel Park and commuters who choose to use the stop by traveling from more eastern suburbs via Library or Broughton Roads.

== History ==
Washington Junction was once an important junction on the Pittsburgh Railways interurban service where the lines to Washington, Pennsylvania meets or diverges from the line to Charleroi. In 1953, both lines were cut back to the Allegheny County line at Drake and Library stations, respectively.
