= Castle Shannon station =

Rail station in Pennsylvania, US

Castle Shannon
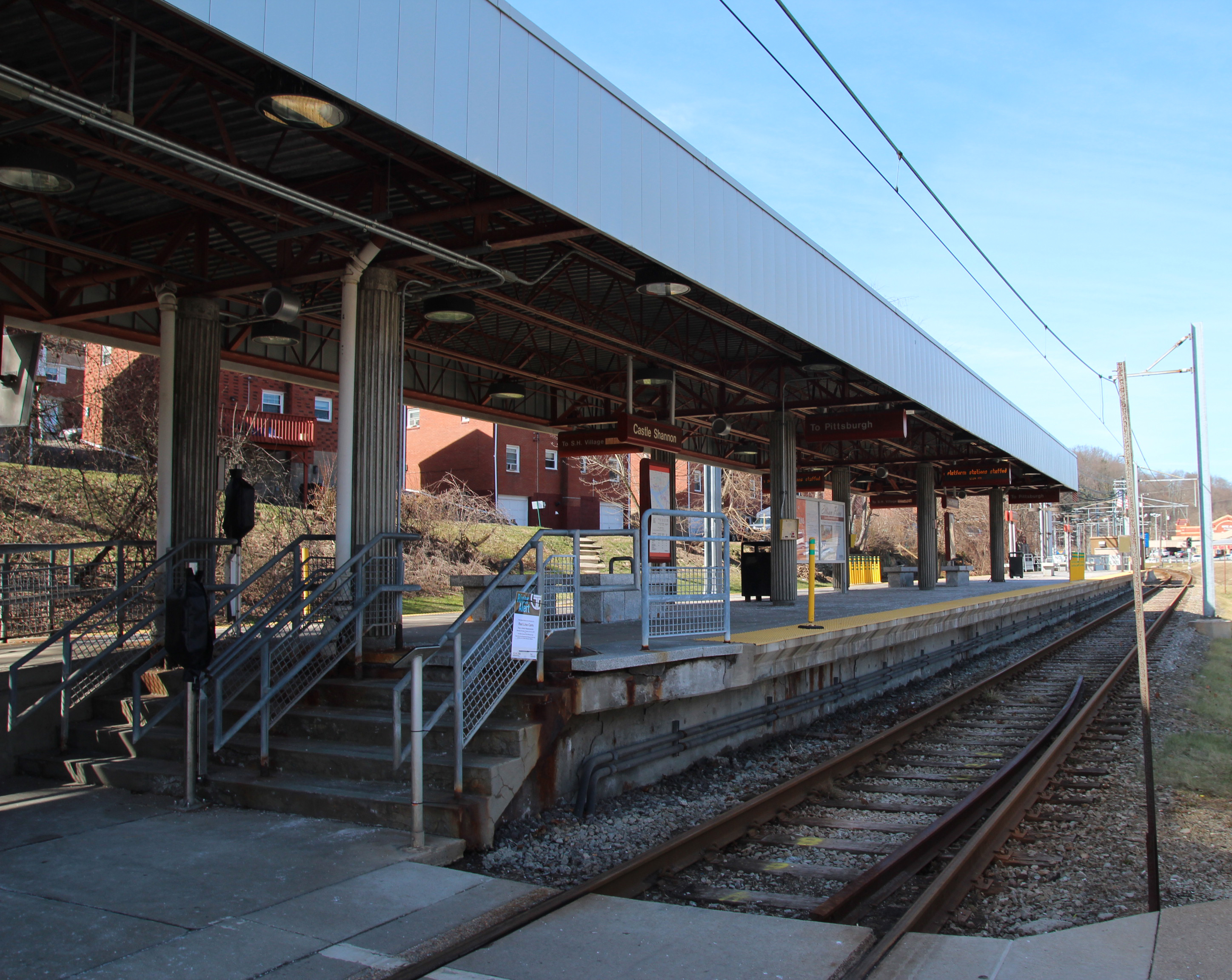

General information
- Location: Castle Shannon Boulevard and Mount Lebanon Boulevard, Castle Shannon, Pennsylvania 15234
- Coordinates: 40.3682°N 80.0302°W
- Owner: Pittsburgh Regional Transit
- Platforms: 1 island platform
- Tracks: 2

Construction
- Parking: 500 spaces
- Accessible: Yes

History
- Opened: April 15, 1984

Passengers
- 2018: 511 (weekday boardings)

Services
Preceding station	Pittsburgh Regional Transit	Following station
Arlington toward Allegheny	Red Line	Overbrook Junction toward South Hills Village
Former services
Preceding station	Port Authority of Allegheny County	Following station
Terminus	47D Drake 1993–1999	Martin Villa toward Drake
Location

Castle Shannon is a station on the Red Line of Pittsburgh Regional Transit's light rail network. It is located in Castle Shannon, Pennsylvania. Located away from the suburb's main commercial and residential districts, the station is designed primarily as a commuter stop, with 500 spaces available for park and ride users.
