= 47D Drake =

Former streetcar line in Pittsburgh, Pennsylvania, United States

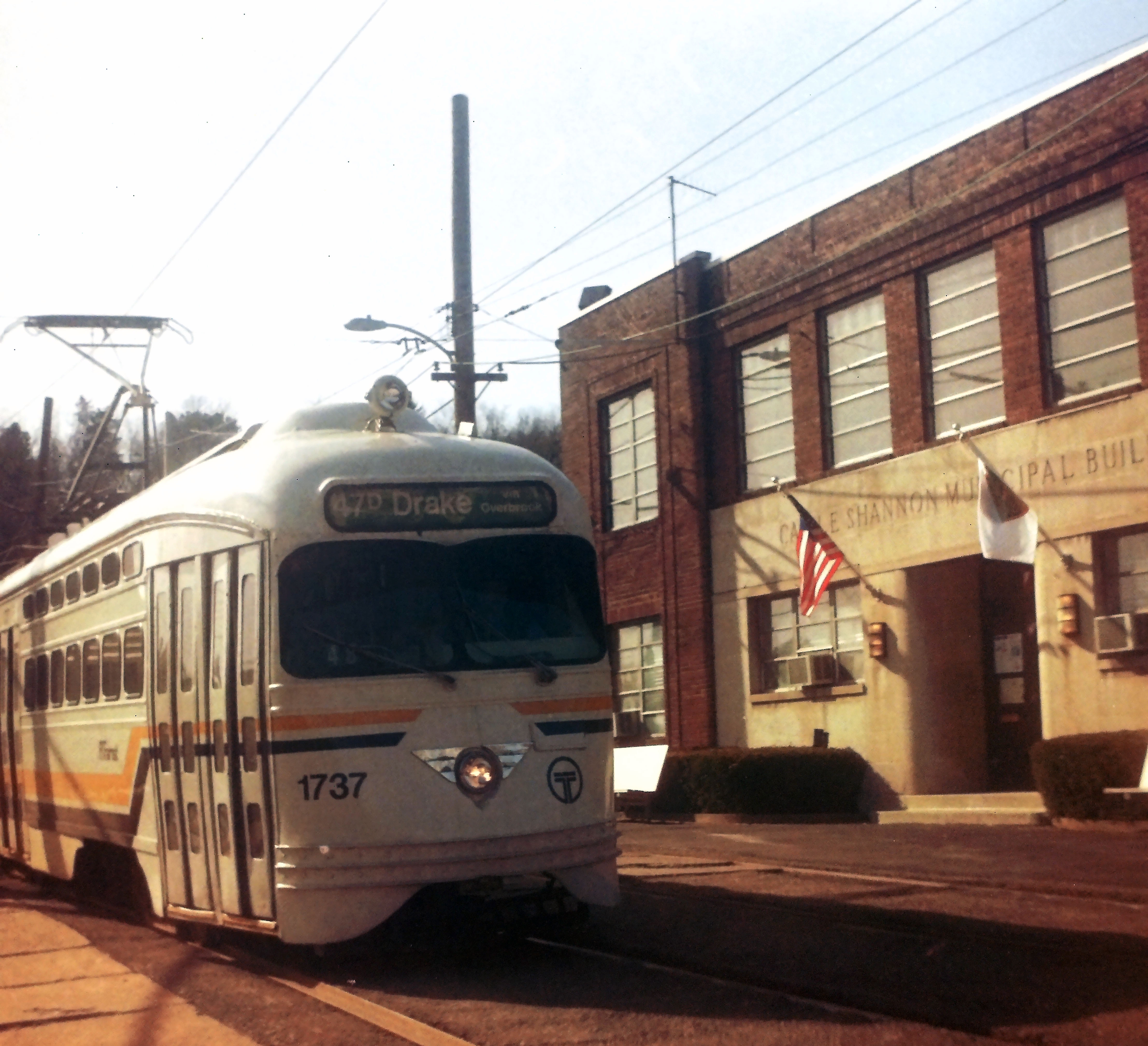
- 47D Drake in Castle Shannon around 1991

Overview
- Status: Service discontinued, line exists in derelict condition
- Owner: Port Authority of Allegheny County
- Locale: Pittsburgh, Pennsylvania, U.S.
- Termini: Gateway (until 1993) Castle Shannon (1993–1999); Drake

Service
- Type: Light rail
- System: Pittsburgh Light Rail
- Operator: Port Authority of Allegheny County
- Rolling stock: 12 4000-series PCC cars

History
- Closed: September 4, 1999

Technical
- Num of tracks: 1
- Track gauge: 5 ft 2 1/2 in (1,588 mm) Pennsylvania trolley gauge
- Electrification: Overhead line, 600 V DC

47D Drake was a streetcar line that was part of the Pittsburgh Light Rail system. It closed in 1999.

== History ==
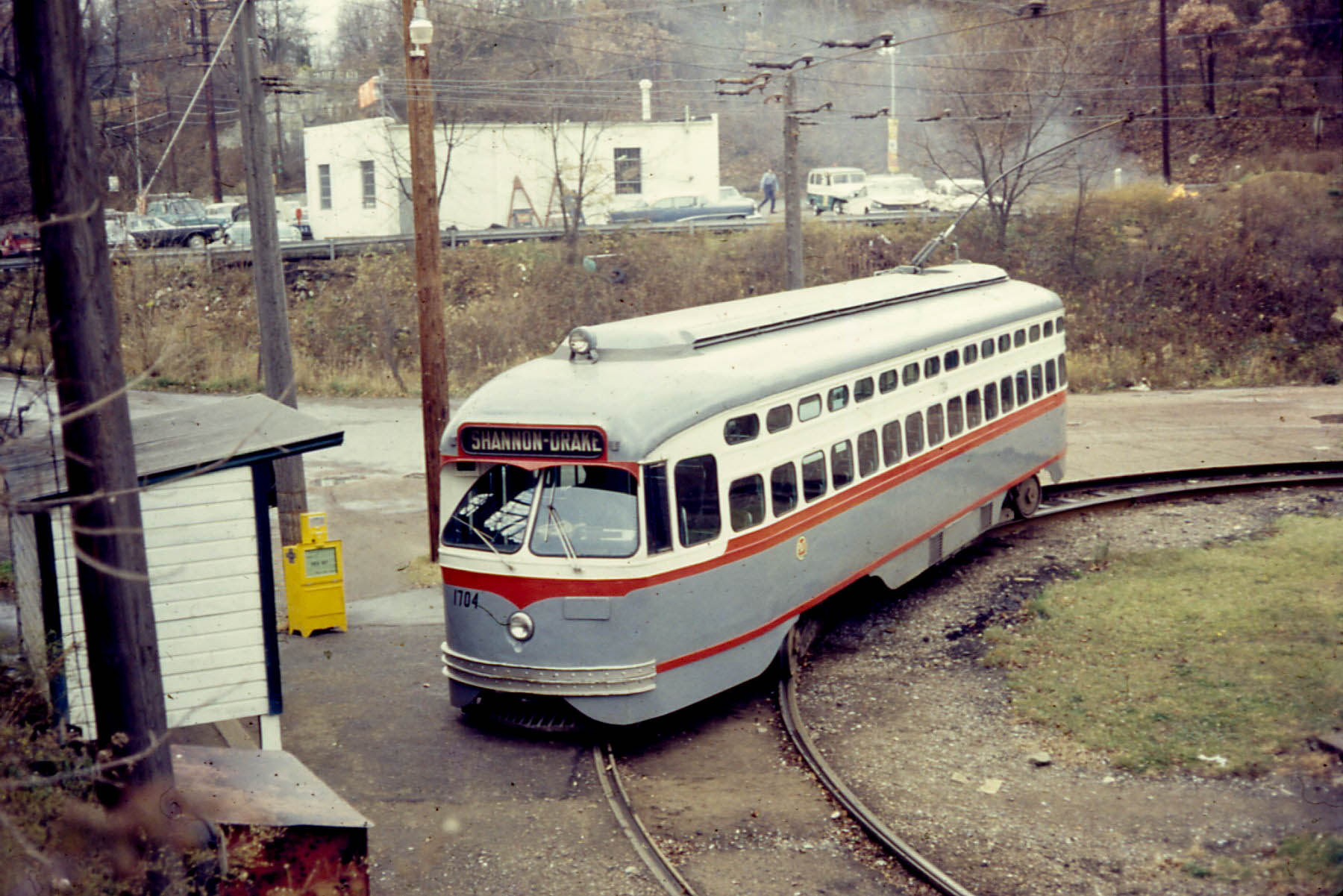
36 Shannon-Drake car at the Drake loop in 1967

The 47D was the last line in the city of Pittsburgh to use PCC streetcars.

The route originated as part of a Pittsburgh Railways interurban line that opened between Washington and Canonsburg in 1903. In 1909, it was extended from Canonsburg to connect with tracks to Pittsburgh via Drake that had been built for an earlier interurban to Charleroi, with the junction designated as Washington Junction. The Washington service operated approximately nine trips per day and was therefore built largely as single-track with passing sidings. Interurban service to Washington and Charleroi ended in 1953, when Pittsburgh Railways cut the lines back to the Allegheny County line at Drake and Library, respectively. A new terminal loop at Drake was constructed beneath the trestle that had previously carried the interurban over McMurray Road. Following the truncation, the Drake and Library branches continued to operate as local streetcar routes. The line was re-designated as 36 Shannon-Drake.

During the 1980s, Port Authority of Allegheny County reconstructed portions of the system as part of the Stage I light rail project, which included upgrades to the Drake line between Castle Shannon and Dorchester, where a new short spur was constructed to serve a new terminal at South Hills Village. The 1.2-mile (1.9 km) outer segment of the Drake line remained largely unchanged. Turnaround loops were built at Bethel Village, Washington Junction, and Castle Shannon to allow for PCC's to turn around for shuttle runs, depending on service needs. The route was re-designated as 47D Drake via Overbrook and operated in the new Downtown Pittsburgh subway.

After the 1993 closure of the Overbrook route, the 47D operated exclusively as a shuttle between Drake and Castle Shannon, and later Washington Junction.

Prior to 1984, the Drake line had relatively high ridership, with parking at the Drake loop frequently filled. The Port Authority planned to rebuild the line as part of the proposed Stage II reconstruction program. However, the opening of South Hills Village station shifted ridership to that facility, which offered a larger park-and-ride lot. By the 1990s, daily ridership on the Drake line had declined to approximately 30 to 50 passengers. At the same time, the PCC cars used on the line experienced increasing mechanical problems, and replacement parts became difficult to obtain. The line was closed on September 4, 1999.

Much of the Drake line as it existed at the time of closure remains in place, though in derelict condition. The section from the Drake Loop to the "S" curve near the former Walthers stop was removed shortly after the line was discontinued in 1999. Overhead power wiring beyond Fort Couch Road to the end of the line was removed at an unspecified date after closure. However, the segment between Fort Couch Road and Dorchester, where the South Hills Village spur joins the Drake line, remains maintained and energized. When the Port Authority took delivery of new LRVs for the rebuilt Overbrook line in 2004, the vehicles were tested on the remaining Drake line prior to entering revenue service. The tunnel beneath Fort Couch Road is occasionally used for storage of non-revenue rail vehicles.

=== Fleet ===
During the final years of operation, three PCCs were used with a fourth kept as reserve. Car #4004 was donated to the Pennsylvania Trolley Museum where it has become part of a collection of historic streetcars and trolleys from all across the United States and other nations. The San Francisco Municipal Railway (Muni) acquired #4008 and #4009 in an internet auction in 2002 for $5,000 each. However, they needed to be re-gauged and differ significantly from other PCCs in that agency's fleet, and were ultimately scrapped in 2019.
