= Blue Line (Pittsburgh) =

Light rail line in Pittsburgh, Pennsylvania

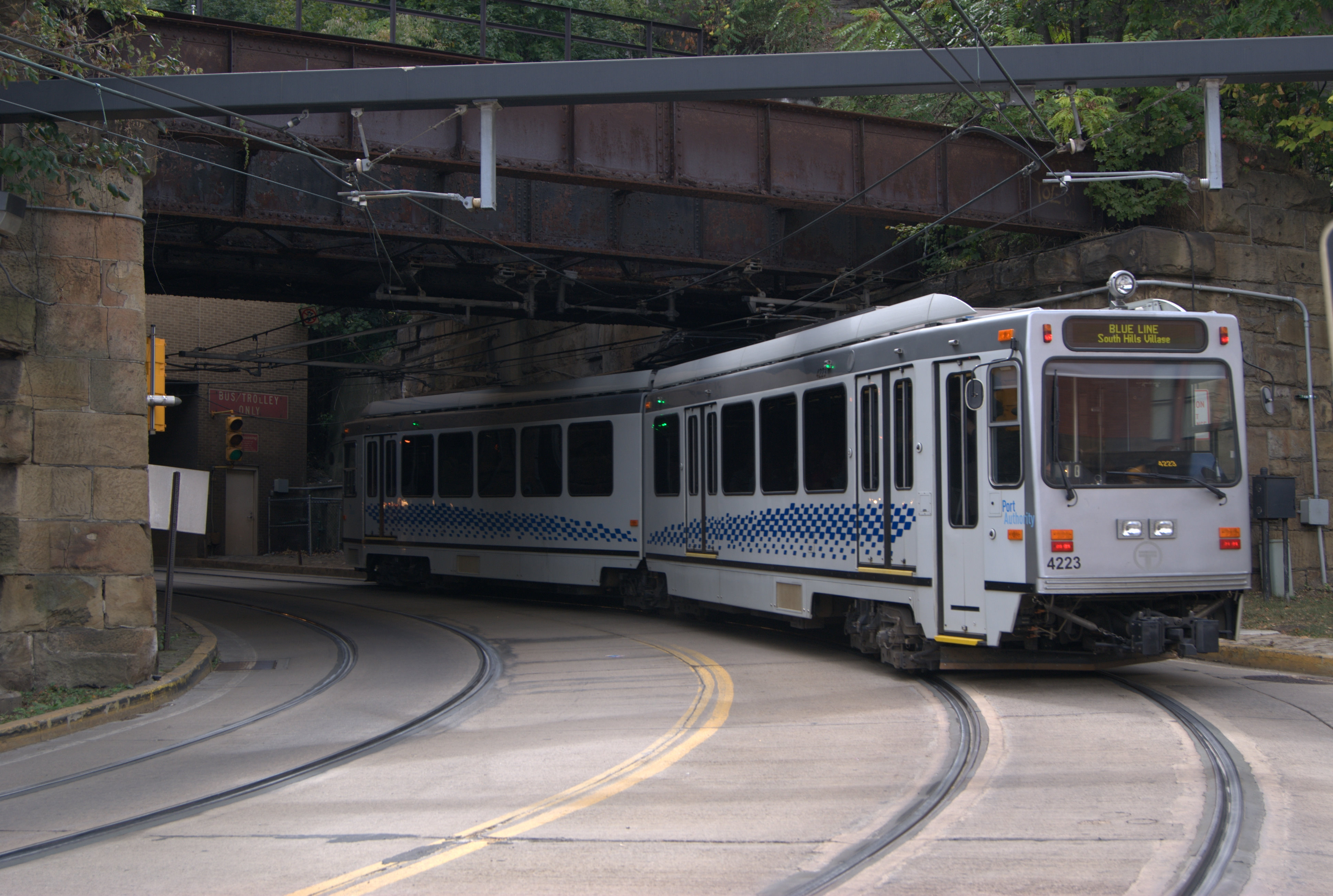
- Southbound Blue Line train departs Station Square, heading into the Mount Washington Transit Tunnel

Overview
- Other name: 47S South Hills Village via Overbrook
- Owner: Pittsburgh Regional Transit
- Locale: Pittsburgh
- Termini: Allegheny; South Hills Village
- Stations: 24

Service
- Type: Light rail
- System: Pittsburgh Light Rail
- Depot(s): South Hills Village Rail Center
- Rolling stock: Siemens SD-400; CAF LRV
- Daily ridership: 6,085 (2025)

Technical
- Track gauge: 5 ft 2 1/2 in (1,588 mm) Pennsylvania trolley gauge
- Electrification: Overhead line, 650 V DC
Route map
Blue Line highlighted in blue
Key

The Blue Line is a Pittsburgh Light Rail line that operates between Pittsburgh's North Shore and South Hills Village via Downtown and the neighborhoods of Knoxville and Overbrook, as well as Castle Shannon and Bethel Park. The line operates over the Overbrook line (shared with the Silver Line) and the South Hills Village line (shared with the Red Line). The line is owned and operated by Pittsburgh Regional Transit.

== History ==
The line from South Hills Junction to Castle Shannon via Overbrook (now known as the Overbrook Line and used by the Blue and Silver Line) was constructed by the Pittsburgh and Castle Shannon Railroad (P&CSRR) between 1872 and 1874. In 1905, Pittsburgh Railways leased the route and, between 1909 and 1910, converted it to dual gauge, retaining the existing narrow gauge for coal trains while adding the broad 5 ft 2 1/2 in (1,588 mm) Pennsylvania trolley gauge for passenger service using streetcars. Although the line was electrified with overhead lines for trolley operation, coal trains continued to use steam locomotives.

The line originally operated between Pittsburgh and Library. A branch to South Hills Village was added in 1987 to complement the Red Line, which serves the same terminus via Beechview.

While the Beechview line (used by the Red Line) was rebuilt during the 1980s to accommodate modern light rail vehicles, the Overbrook line remained largely unchanged and continued to be operated with mid-20th century PCC streetcars, most notably the 4000 series. Its reconstruction was deferred pending additional funding. However, continued deterioration of the track and infrastructure led the Port Authority of Allegheny County to suspend service on the line in 1993. The line remained dormant until 1999, when reconstruction work began.

The line was rebuilt at a cost of $386 million as a fully double-tracked route with gentler curves designed for modern light rail vehicles, significantly improving travel times. The reconstruction effectively created a new line along the original right-of-way, featuring continuously welded rail, upgraded catenary and signaling systems, and other modernizations. The 22 traditional street-level trolley stops were replaced with eight accessible light rail stations with high-level platforms. Service resumed on June 2, 2004.

The modern Blue Line service was established on May 16, 2005, as 47S South Hills Village via Overbrook. Pittsburgh Regional Transit introduced the route in conjunction with the opening of a new parking garage at South Hills Village station, with the aim of relieving congestion on the Red Line generated by increased ridership. The service functioned as a limited-stop option, as the Overbrook routing offers higher average speeds and fewer stops.

On June 25, 2012, two stations on the South Hills Village branch, Santa Barbara and Martin Villa, were closed as part of a system-wide consolidation.

In February 2020, the route between Pittsburgh and Library via Overbrook was redesignated as the Silver Line to clarify service patterns.

== Route ==
From north to south, the line begins at the elevated Allegheny station on the North Shore, before heading underground to North Side and proceeding beneath the Allegheny River. It continues through Downtown Pittsburgh, stopping at Gateway, Wood Street, and Steel Plaza, before surfacing at First Avenue.

Leaving downtown, the line crosses the Monongahela River via the Panhandle Bridge, stopping at Station Square, and then passes through the Mount Washington Transit Tunnel to South Hills Junction, where the Red Line diverges and the former Brown Line once branched off to serve the Allentown neighborhood. The Blue and Silver Line then continue south along a modern light rail alignment through the Beltzhoover, Bon Air, Carrick, Brookline, and Overbrook neighborhoods, serving Boggs, Bon Air, Denise, South Bank, McNeilly, Killarney, and Memorial Hall, all of which are accessible stations.

At Willow station in Bethel Park, the Red Line rejoins, having reached the area via the Beechview neighborhood. The three lines continue through stops at St. Anne's and Smith Road before reaching Washington Junction, where the Silver Line diverges toward Library station in South Park Township. The Red and Blue lines continue to South Hills Village, with intermediate stops at Casswell, Highland, Bethel Village, and Dorchester.

== Station list ==
The Pittsburgh Light Rail has three types of stations. They are low platform, high platform, and underground. High platform and underground stations are wheelchair accessible as the train doors are level with the platform. Low platform stations are not wheelchair accessible as they require passengers to climb stairs to board the light rail vehicle.

Name	Miles	Disabled access	Type	Other services	City (Neighborhood)
Allegheny	0.00	Disabled access	high platform	Red Silver	Pittsburgh (Chateau)
North Side	0.51	Disabled access	underground	Red Silver	Pittsburgh (North Shore)
Gateway	1.00	Disabled access	underground	Red Silver	Pittsburgh (Downtown)
Wood Street	1.26	Disabled access	underground	Red Silver	Pittsburgh (Downtown)
Steel Plaza	1.55	Disabled access	underground	Red Silver	Pittsburgh (Downtown)
First Avenue	1.88	Disabled access	high platform	Red Silver	Pittsburgh (Downtown)
Station Square	2.41	Disabled access	high platform	Red Silver South Busway; Monongahela Incline	Pittsburgh (South Shore)
South Hills Junction	3.25	Disabled access	high platform	Red Silver South Busway	Pittsburgh (Mt. Washington)
Boggs	3.66	Disabled access	high platform	Silver	Pittsburgh (Beltzhoover)
Bon Air	4.30	Disabled access	high platform	Silver	Pittsburgh (Bon Air)
Denise	5.09	Disabled access	high platform	Silver	Pittsburgh (Carrick)
South Bank	5.49	Disabled access	high platform	Silver South Busway	Pittsburgh (Overbrook)
McNeilly	6.73	Disabled access	high platform	Silver	Baldwin Township
Killarney	7.06	Disabled access	high platform	Silver	Castle Shannon
Memorial Hall	7.76	Disabled access	high platform	Silver	Castle Shannon
Willow	8.31	Disabled access	high platform	Silver	Castle Shannon
St. Anne's	8.69	#	low platform	Red Silver	Castle Shannon
Smith Road	8.97	#	low platform	Red Silver	Castle Shannon
Washington Junction	9.21	Disabled access	high platform	Red Silver	Bethel Park
Casswell	9.69	#	low platform	Red	Bethel Park
Highland	9.98	#	low platform	Red	Bethel Park
Bethel Village	10.46	#	low platform	Red	Bethel Park
Dorchester	10.75	#	low platform	Red	Bethel Park
South Hills Village	11.02	Disabled access	high platform	Red	Upper St. Clair
