= Library station (Pittsburgh) =

Light rail station in South Park, Pennsylvania

Library
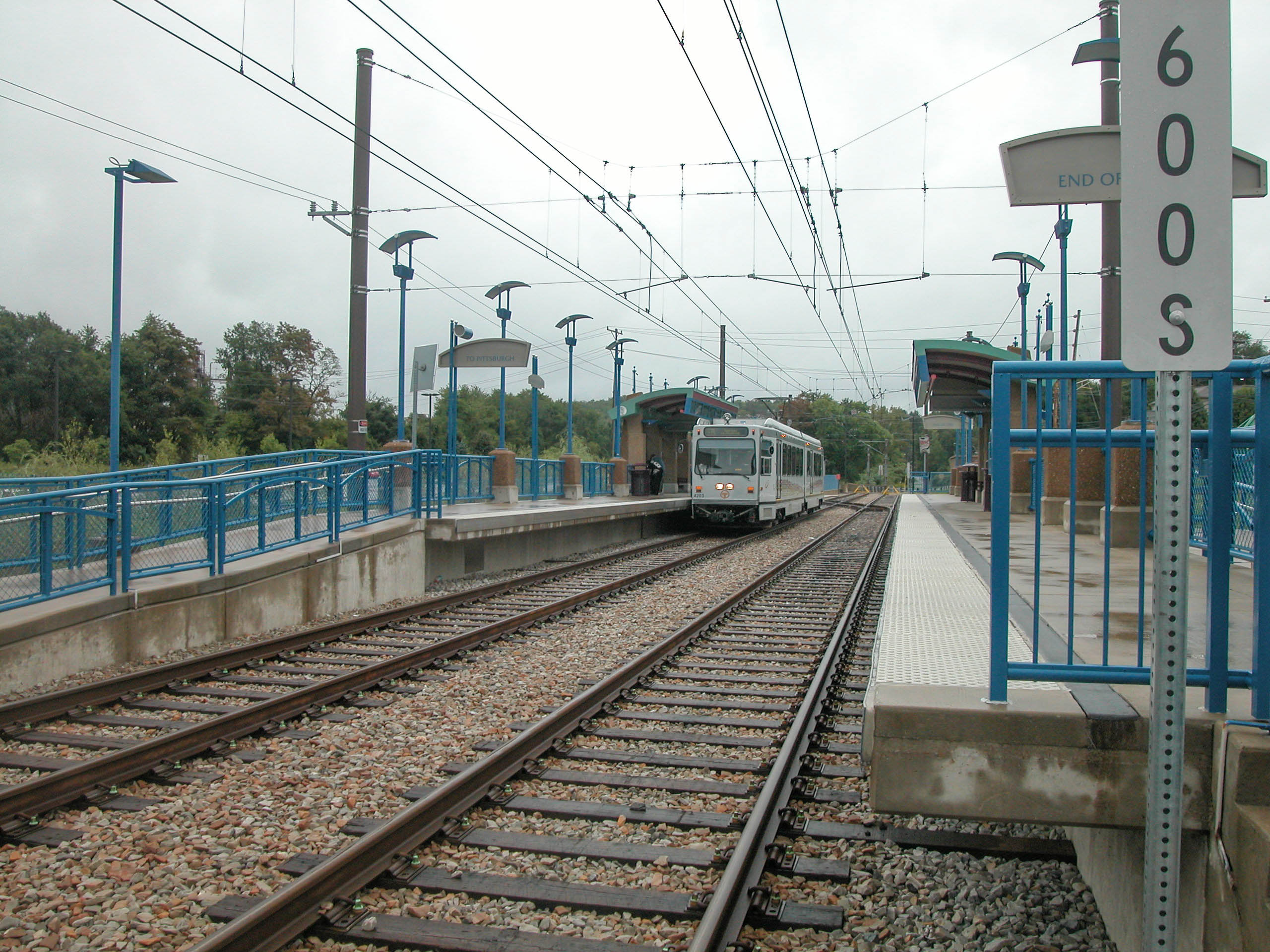
- Library station, looking south, September 2009

General information
- Location: Brownsville Road and Pleasant Street; South Park, Pennsylvania
- Coordinates: 40.2871°N 80.0208°W
- Owner: Pittsburgh Regional Transit
- Line: Library Line
- Platforms: 2 side platforms
- Tracks: 2

Construction
- Structure type: At-grade
- Parking: 430 spaces
- Accessible: Yes

History
- Opened: September 12, 1903
- Rebuilt: 1953, 1993, 2004
- Former names: Simmons

Passengers
- 2018: 527 (weekday boardings)

Services
Preceding station	Pittsburgh Regional Transit	Following station
West Library toward Allegheny	Silver Line	Terminus
Former services
Preceding station	Port Authority of Allegheny County	Following station
Pleasant toward Gateway	47L Library via Overbrook	Terminus
Location

Library station is a station on the Pittsburgh Light Rail network, operated by Pittsburgh Regional Transit, serving the Library neighborhood in South Park, Pennsylvania. It is the southern terminus of the Silver Line.

The station includes a 430-space park-and-ride lot serving commuters from South Park and nearby communities in Washington County. The name derives from the surrounding neighborhood; no public lending library is located near the station.

== History ==
The Pittsburgh Railways interurban line from Charleroi to Pittsburgh opened through South Park on September 12, 1903, with passengers transferring at Castle Shannon to continue to Downtown via the Pittsburgh and Castle Shannon Railroad. At that time, a stop known as Simmons was established to serve the Library area.

In 1953, interurban service was discontinued and the line was cut back to Library. A turnaround loop was constructed at Simmons to accommodate single-ended PCC streetcars operating on the route. The use of PCC cars ended in 1993, when the line was converted to light rail operation with the introduction of larger, articulated vehicles, which did not require a loop. In 2004, the loop was removed and a new station was built to accommodate the light rail vehicles.
