= List of Pittsburgh Light Rail stations =

The Pittsburgh Light Rail, commonly known as the T system, is the light rail system for Pittsburgh, Pennsylvania. It is run by Pittsburgh Regional Transit and currently consists of the Red Line, Blue Line and Silver Line. Trolley lines began on the T's route in 1897, and currently The T is the eighteenth most used light rail system in the United States. As of the fourth quarter of 2013 it had an annual ridership of 8,321,700, with 28,300 daily boardings over its 26.2 mile length. It has 53 stations over two lines and was last expanded in 2012 with the completion of the North Shore Connector.

== Stations and stops ==
=== Active ===
Station	Lines	Location	Station opened	Average boardings
Allegheny	Blue Line Red Line Silver Line	Pittsburgh	March 25, 2012	682
Arlington	Red Line	Castle Shannon	May 22, 1987	90
Beagle	Silver Line	Bethel Park		6
Belasco	Red Line	Pittsburgh	May 22, 1987	
Bethel Village	Blue Line Red Line	Bethel Park	April 15, 1984	24
Boggs	Blue Line Silver Line	Pittsburgh	June 2, 2004	14
Bon Air	Blue Line Silver Line	Pittsburgh	June 2, 2004	7
Casswell	Blue Line Red Line	Bethel Park	April 15, 1984	5
Castle Shannon	Red Line	Castle Shannon	April 15, 1984	76
Dawn	Red Line	Pittsburgh		16
Denise	Blue Line Silver Line	Pittsburgh	June 2, 2004	19
Dorchester	Blue Line Red Line	Bethel Park	April 15, 1984	36
Dormont Junction	Red Line	Dormont		200
Fallowfield	Red Line	Pittsburgh	May 22, 1987	151
First Avenue	Blue Line Red Line Silver Line	Pittsburgh	November 16, 2001	464
Gateway	Blue Line Red Line Silver Line	Pittsburgh	July 3, 1985	1,067
Hampshire	Red Line	Pittsburgh	May 22, 1987	66
Highland	Blue Line Red Line	Bethel Park	April 15, 1984	15
Hillcrest	Silver Line	Bethel Park		5
Killarney	Blue Line Silver Line	Castle Shannon	June 2, 2004	37
King's School	Silver Line	Bethel Park		6
Library	Silver Line	Bethel Park		14
Logan	Silver Line	Bethel Park		7
Lytle	Silver Line	Bethel Park		14
McNeilly	Blue Line Silver Line	Pittsburgh	June 2, 2004	3
Memorial Hall	Blue Line Silver Line	Castle Shannon	June 2, 2004	303
Mesta	Silver Line	Bethel Park		13
Mt. Lebanon	Red Line	Mt. Lebanon	May 22, 1987	210
Munroe	Silver Line	Bethel Park		9
North Side	Blue Line Red Line Silver Line	Pittsburgh	March 25, 2012	690
Palm Garden	Red Line	Pittsburgh		18
Penn Station	Shuttle	Pittsburgh		18
Poplar	Red Line	Mt. Lebanon	May 22, 1987	34
Potomac	Red Line	Dormont	May 22, 1987	311
Sandy Creek	Silver Line	Bethel Park		8
Sarah	Silver Line	Bethel Park		4
Shiras	Red Line	Pittsburgh	May 22, 1987	
Smith Road	Blue Line Red Line Silver Line	Castle Shannon		9
South Bank	Blue Line Silver Line	Pittsburgh	June 2, 2004	45
South Hills Junction	Blue Line Red Line Silver Line	Pittsburgh		439
South Hills Village	Blue Line Red Line	Bethel Park	April 15, 1984	318
South Park	Silver Line	Bethel Park		13
St. Anne's	Blue Line Red Line Silver Line	Castle Shannon		87
Station Square	Blue Line Red Line Silver Line	Pittsburgh		410
Steel Plaza	Blue Line Red Line Shuttle Silver Line	Pittsburgh	July 3, 1985	1,749
Stevenson	Red Line	Dormont	May 22, 1987	30
Washington Junction	Blue Line Red Line Silver Line	Bethel Park	May 15, 1984	362
Westfield	Red Line	Pittsburgh	May 22, 1987	31
West Library	Silver Line	Bethel Park		19
Willow	Blue Line Silver Line	Castle Shannon	June 2, 2004	29
Wood Street	Blue Line Red Line Silver Line	Pittsburgh	July 3, 1985	835

=== Closed ===
A number of minor stops were closed with the conversion of the system from streetcars to light rail – for example, 22 pre-1993 stops on the Overbrook line were replaced with 8 stations when the line reopened in 2004. Several batches of stops have closed since the mid-1990s. Six were closed on September 5, 1999, when the 47D Drake shuttle was discontinued. Ten were closed on March 27, 2011, when the Brown Line was discontinued as part of systemwide cuts. Eleven more were closed on June 25, 2012, due to low ridership. Pennant closed on February 15, 2021 due to low ridership and deteriorating station conditions.

Station	Lines	Location	Station opened	Station closed
Allen	Brown Line	Pittsburgh		March 27, 2011
Beltzhoover	Brown Line	Pittsburgh		March 27, 2011
Bethel Farms	47D Drake	Bethel Park		September 5, 1999
Boustead	Red Line	Pittsburgh	May 22, 1987	June 25, 2012
Brookside Boulevard	47D Drake	Bethel Park		September 5, 1999
Brookside Farms	47D Drake	Bethel Park		September 5, 1999
Center	Blue Line	Bethel Park		June 25, 2012
Coast	Red Line	Pittsburgh	May 22, 1987	June 25, 2012
Curtain	Brown Line	Pittsburgh		March 27, 2011
Drake Loop	47D Drake	Upper St. Clair		September 5, 1999
Estella	Brown Line	Pittsburgh		March 27, 2011
Fort Couch Road	47D Drake	Bethel Park		September 5, 1999
Haberman	Brown Line	Pittsburgh		March 27, 2011
Harwood Steps	Brown Line	Pittsburgh		March 27, 2011
Kelton	Red Line	Dormont	May 22, 1987	June 25, 2012
Latimer	Blue Line	Bethel Park		June 25, 2012
Lindermer	Blue Line	Bethel Park		June 25, 2012
Martin Villa	Blue Line Red Line	Castle Shannon	May 22, 1987	June 25, 2012
Mine 3	Blue Line	Bethel Park		June 25, 2012
Neeld	Red Line	Pittsburgh	May 22, 1987	June 25, 2012
Newton	Brown Line	Pittsburgh		March 27, 2011
Pennant	Red Line	Pittsburgh	May 22, 1987	February 15, 2021
Roanoke	Brown Line	Pittsburgh		March 27, 2011
Santa Barbara	Blue Line	Bethel Park		June 25, 2012
Traymore	Red Line	Pittsburgh	May 22, 1987	June 25, 2012
Walthers	47D Drake	Upper St. Clair		September 5, 1999
William	Brown Line	Pittsburgh		March 27, 2011
