= Coast station (PAAC) =

Coast
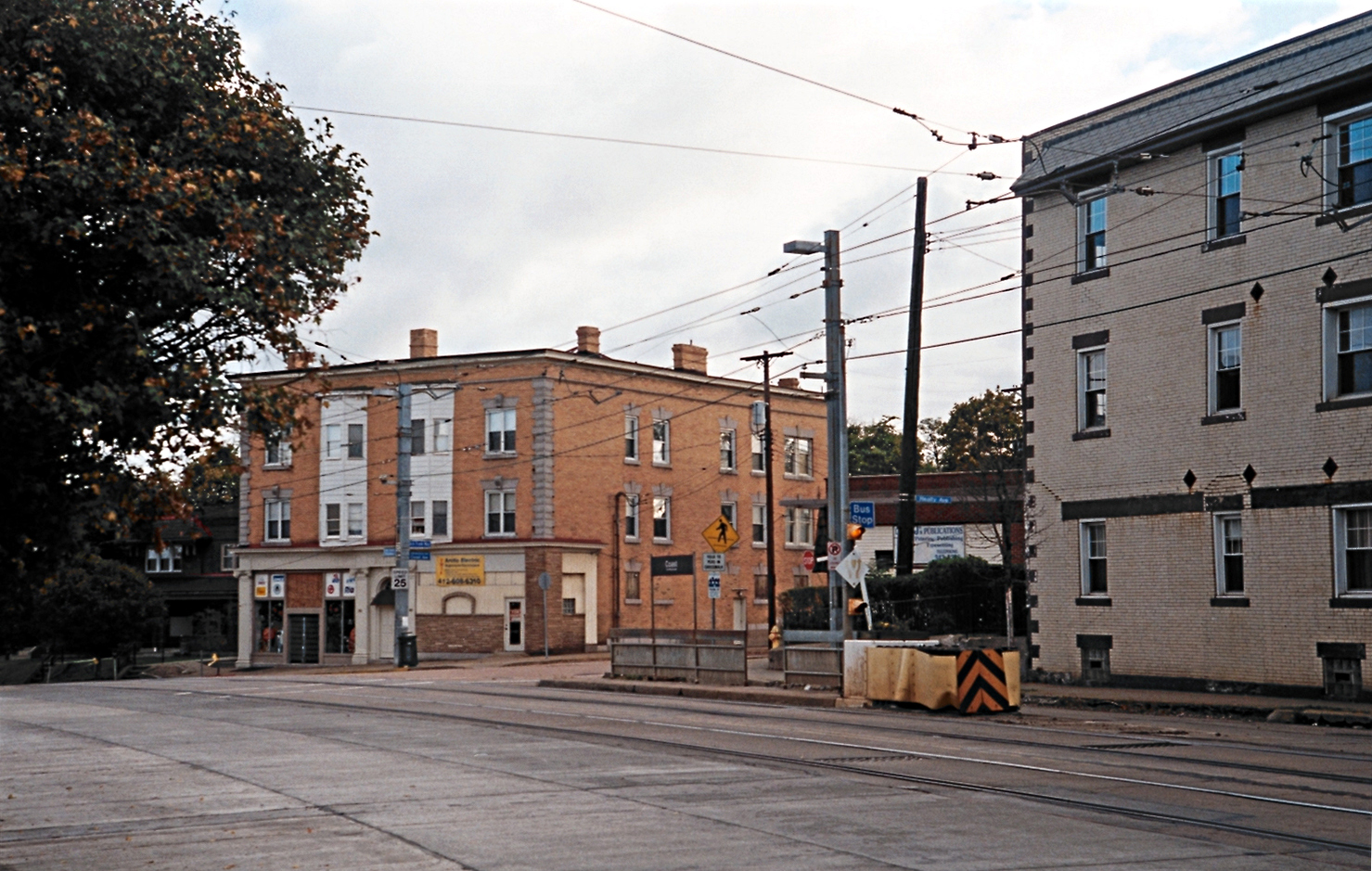

General information
- Location: Broadway Avenue and Coast Avenue; Pittsburgh, Pennsylvania
- Coordinates: 40.4086°N 80.0248°W
- Owner: Port Authority
- Tracks: 2

History
- Opened: May 22, 1987
- Closed: June 25, 2012

Former services
| Preceding station | Port Authority of Allegheny County | Following station |
|---|---|---|
| Hampshire toward Allegheny | Red Line Overbrook Junction via Beechview | Belasco toward Overbrook Junction or South Hills Village |
Location

Coast was a station on the Port Authority of Allegheny County's light rail network, located in the Beechview neighborhood of Pittsburgh, Pennsylvania. The street level stop was located on a small island platform in the middle of Broadway Avenue, through which The T traveled along former streetcar tracks. The station served a densely populated residential area through which bus service was limited because of the hilly terrain.

Coast was one of eleven stops closed on June 25, 2012 as part of a system-wide consolidation effort.
