= Boustead station =

Boustead
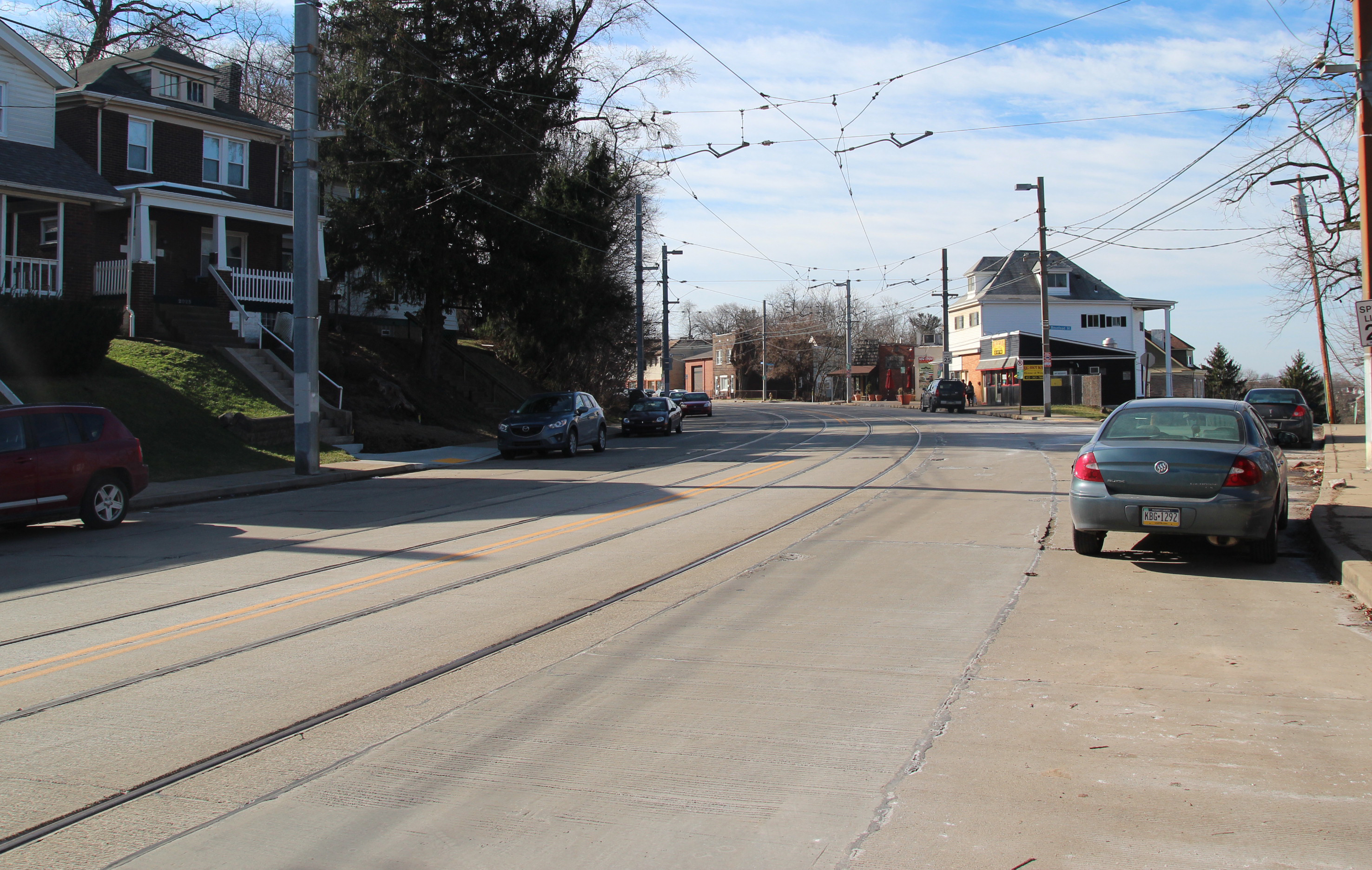
- The station area in 2017. Nothing remains except for a patch in the concrete where the platform used to be.

General information
- Location: Broadway Avenue and Boustead Street; Pittsburgh, Pennsylvania
- Coordinates: 40.4060°N 80.0292°W
- Owner: Port Authority
- Tracks: 2

History
- Opened: May 22, 1987
- Closed: June 25, 2012

Former services
Preceding station	Port Authority of Allegheny County	Following station
Belasco toward Allegheny	Red Line Overbrook Junction via Beechview	Shiras toward Overbrook Junction or South Hills Village
Location

Boustead was a station on the Port Authority of Allegheny County's light rail network, located in the Beechview neighborhood of Pittsburgh, Pennsylvania. The street level stop was located on a small island platform in the middle of Broadway Avenue, through which the T travels along former streetcar tracks. The station served a densely populated residential area through which bus service is limited because of the hilly terrain.

Boustead was one of eleven stops closed on June 25, 2012 as part of a system-wide consolidation effort.
