= Pennant station =

Pennant
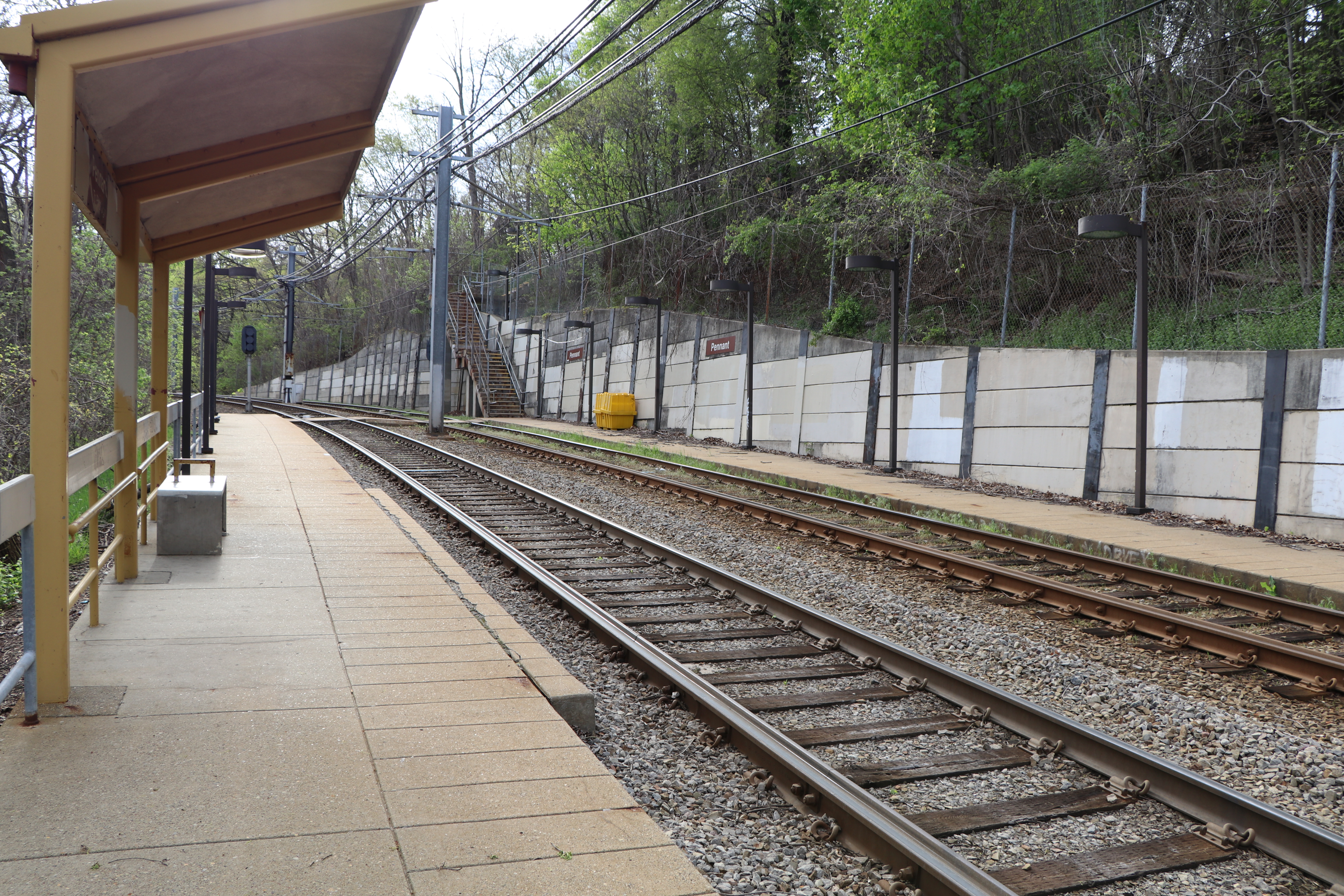
- Looking south in 2017

General information
- Location: off of Platt Avenue; Pittsburgh, Pennsylvania
- Coordinates: 40.4114°N 80.0147°W
- Owner: Port Authority
- Tracks: 2

History
- Opened: May 22, 1987
- Closed: February 15, 2021

Passengers
- 2018: 8 (weekday boardings)

Former services
Preceding station	Port Authority of Allegheny County	Following station
Dawn toward Allegheny	Red Line	Westfield toward South Hills Village
Traymore Closed 2012 toward Allegheny	Red Line Overbrook Junction via Beechview	Westfield toward Overbrook Junction or South Hills Village
Location

Pennant was a station on the Port Authority of Allegheny County's light rail network, located in the Beechview neighborhood of Pittsburgh, Pennsylvania. The street level stop was located in an especially hilly portion of a neighborhood known for its rolling terrain, and providing access to commuters within walking distance.

On February 2, 2021, Port Authority announced in a news release that Pennant station would close permanently, due to deteriorating pedestrian infrastructure and low ridership. According to the release, the stairs connecting Pennant station to Platt Avenue were found to be in poor condition in a routine inspection in fall 2020, and in another recent inspection, Port Authority engineers found further deterioration. The permanent closure went into effect on Monday, February 15, 2021.
