= Belasco station =

Pittsburgh Light Rail station

Belasco
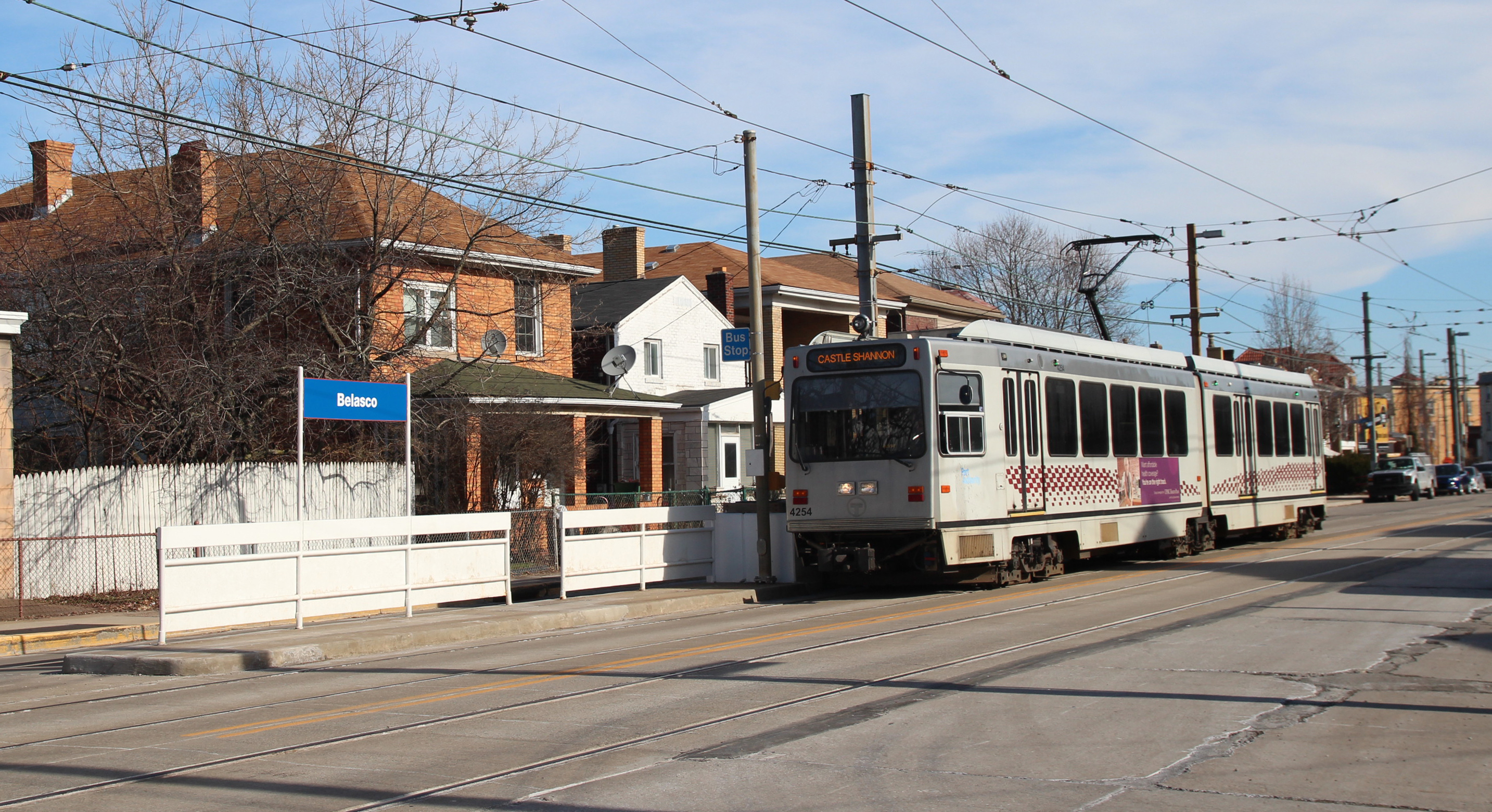
- Outbound platform

General information
- Location: Broadway Avenue and Belasco Avenue; Pittsburgh, Pennsylvania
- Coordinates: 40.4071°N 80.0270°W
- Owner: Pittsburgh Regional Transit
- Line: Overbrook line
- Platforms: 2 side platforms
- Tracks: 2

Construction
- Structure type: At-grade
- Accessible: No

History
- Opened: May 22, 1987

Passengers
- 2018: 128 (weekday boardings)

Services
| Preceding station | Pittsburgh Regional Transit | Following station |
|---|---|---|
| Hampshire toward Allegheny | Red Line | Shiras toward South Hills Village |
Former services
| Preceding station | Port Authority of Allegheny County | Following station |
|---|---|---|
| Coast Closed 2012 toward Allegheny | Red Line Overbrook Junction via Beechview | Boustead Closed 2012 toward Overbrook Junction or South Hills Village |
Location

Belasco station is a station on the Pittsburgh Light Rail network operated by Pittsburgh Regional Transit (PRT), located in the Beechview neighborhood of Pittsburgh, Pennsylvania. The station serves a densely populated residential area where bus service is limited due to the area’s hilly terrain. The station consists of two side platforms located on Broadway Avenue near Belasco Avenue.

Between 2020 and 2025, PRT studied upgrading the station to provide accessible high-level platforms; however, it was determined that constructing such facilities within the existing roadway would be incompatible with safe traffic operations. Although the station will remain inaccessible, PRT and the City of Pittsburgh plan improvements in 2026, including the replacement of narrow traffic-island platforms with wider curb extensions (bulb-outs) and the addition of shelters to improve safety and passenger comfort.
