= Dawn station =

Dawn
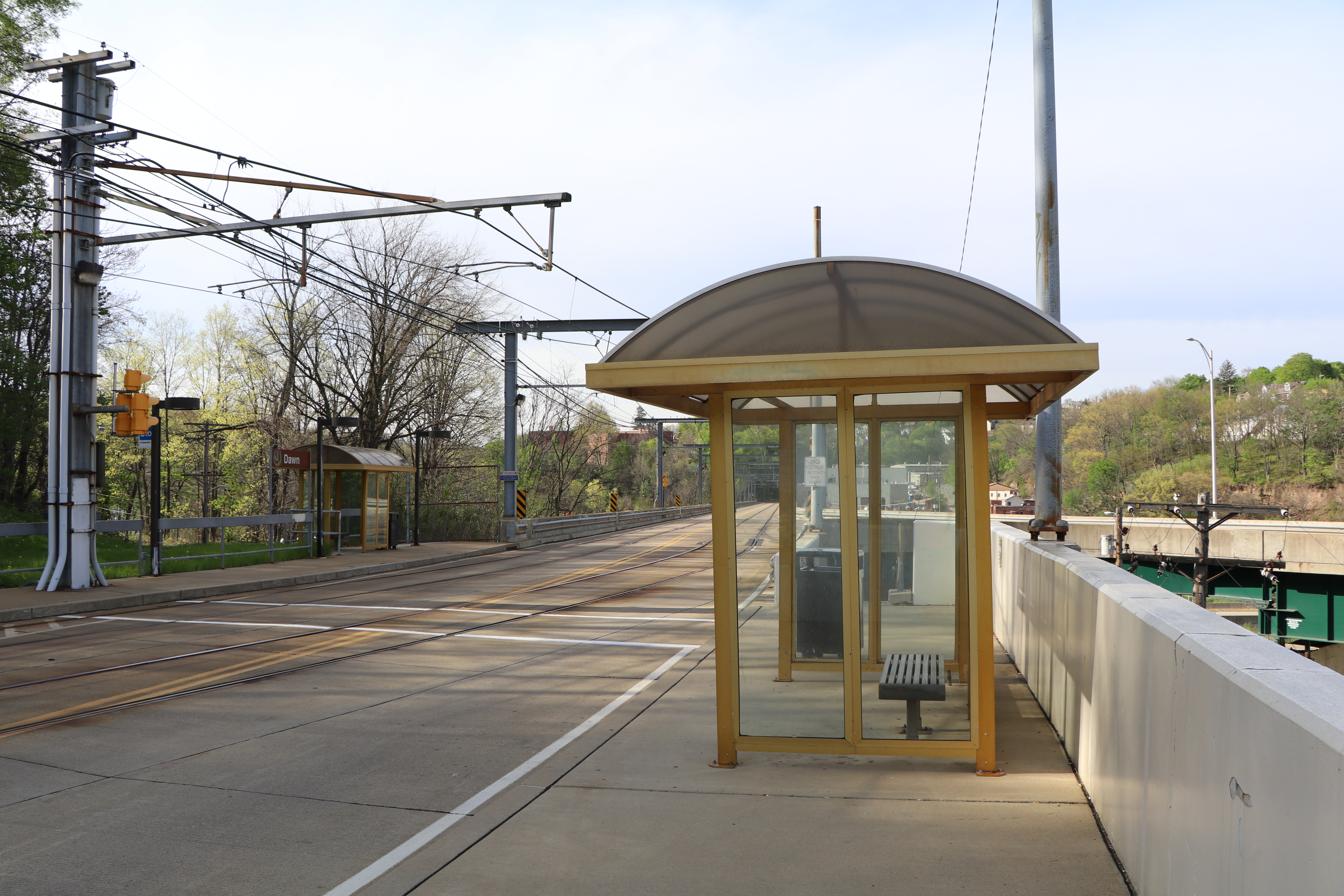
- Inbound platform at Dawn station, with outbound in the distance

General information
- Location: South Busway at Dawn Avenue; Pittsburgh, Pennsylvania
- Coordinates: 40°24′46″N 80°00′39″W
- Owner: Pittsburgh Regional Transit
- Platforms: 2 side platforms
- Tracks: 2
- Bus routes: Pittsburgh Regional Transit: 41

Construction
- Accessible: No, under construction

History
- Rebuilt: 1987

Passengers
- 2018: 7 (weekday boardings)

Services
Preceding station	Pittsburgh Regional Transit	Following station
Palm Garden toward Allegheny	Red Line	Westfield toward South Hills Village
Palm Garden toward Station Square	South Busway W Liberty Ave Ramp	Terminus
Former services
Preceding station	Port Authority of Allegheny County	Following station
Palm Garden toward Allegheny	Red Line	Pennant Closed 2021 toward South Hills Village
Palm Garden toward Allegheny	Red Line Overbrook Junction via Beechview	Traymore Closed 2012 toward Overbrook Junction or South Hills Village
Location

Dawn station is combined light rail and busway station operated by Pittsburgh Regional Transit in the Beechview neighborhood of Pittsburgh, Pennsylvania. The stop is located on an exclusive right-of-way shared by the Red Line of the Pittsburgh Light Rail and South Busway route 41 on an embankment in an especially hilly portion of the Beechview neighborhood known for its rolling terrain, providing access to commuters within walking distance.

== History ==
The original Dawn stop was established at the south end of the Palm Garden trestle where the Pittsburgh Railways trolley right of way crossed over Dawn Avenue. In the 1950s the stop was served by the 38 Mt. Lebanon, 39 Brookline, 42 Dormont, and 43 Neeld services. Just south of the stop was a junction where the line continued on to West Liberty Avenue (service 38 and 39) with the branch to the west proceeding to Broadway (service 42 and 43). When the 38 Mt Lebanon line along West Liberty Avenue was abandoned on May 25, 1963, it was combined with the 42 Dormont and renumbered as 42/38 Mt. Lebanon/Beechview. However, the 42 Dormont continued as a separate service but for rush hour use only. All lines, except the 39 Brookline, eventually became the 42 South Hills Village, the current Red Line. The 39 Brookline was abandoned on September 3, 1966.

In May 2024, the Federal Transit Administration awarded Pittsburgh Regional Transit $8 million to construct accessible platforms at ten Red Line stops, including Dawn.
