= Hampshire station =

Hampshire
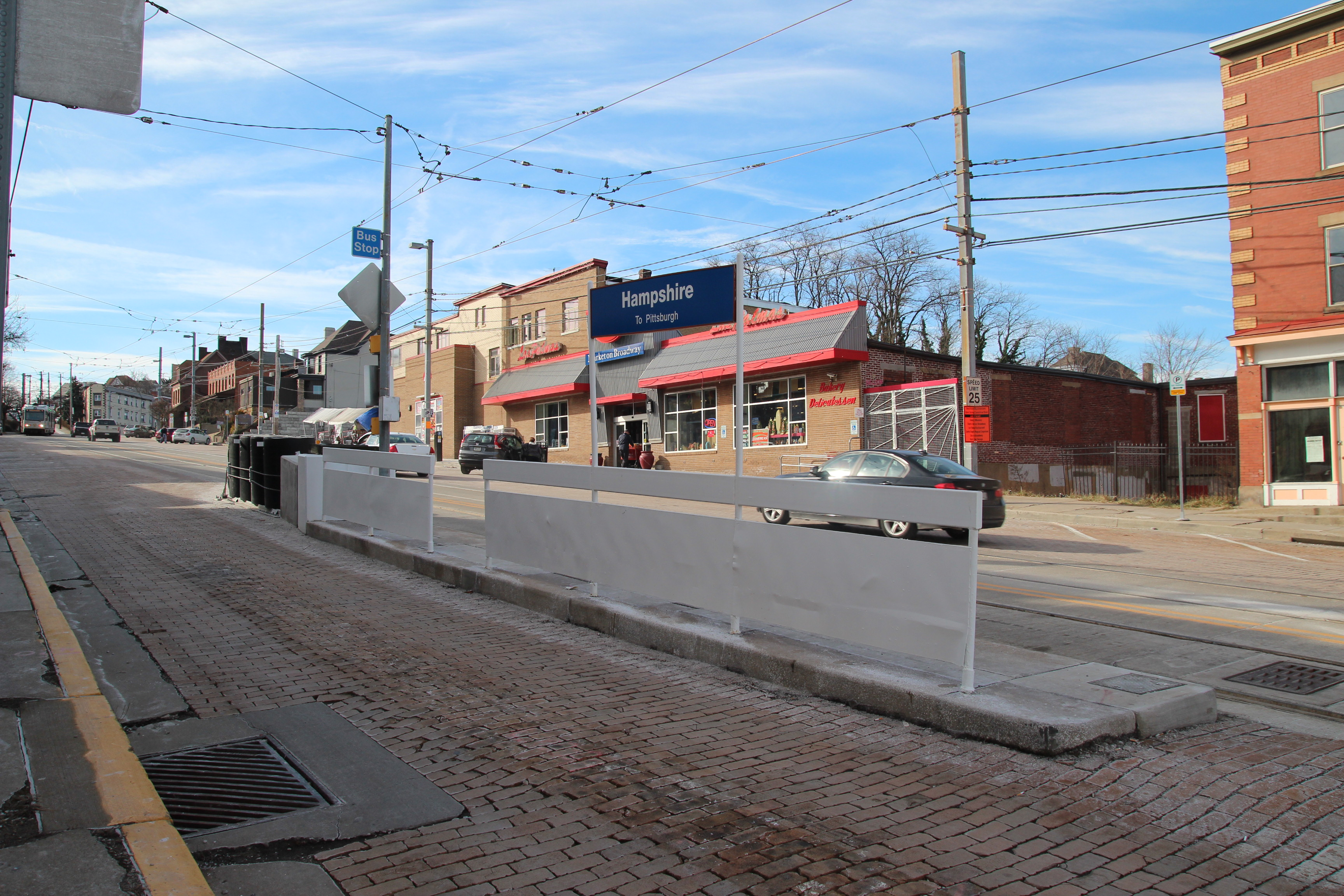
- The inbound platform

General information
- Location: Broadway and Hampshire avenues Pittsburgh, Pennsylvania
- Coordinates: 40.4105°N 80.0247°W
- Owner: Pittsburgh Regional Transit
- Tracks: 2

Construction
- Accessible: No, under construction

History
- Opened: May 22, 1987

Passengers
- 2018: 136 (weekday boardings)

Services
Preceding station	Pittsburgh Regional Transit	Following station
Fallowfield toward Allegheny	Red Line	Belasco toward South Hills Village
Former services
Preceding station	Port Authority of Allegheny County	Following station
Fallowfield toward Allegheny	Red Line Overbrook Junction via Beechview	Coast Closed 2012 toward Overbrook Junction or South Hills Village
Location

Hampshire station is a station on Pittsburgh Regional Transit's light rail network, located in the Beechview neighborhood of Pittsburgh, Pennsylvania. The T travels along former streetcar tracks on Broadway Avenue through the area. The inbound stop is located on a small island platform in the middle of the road, while the outbound stop is just a sign, with no platform. The station serves a densely populated residential area and also the neighborhood's small but crowded business district. It is located in an area where bus service is limited because of the hilly terrain.

In May 2024, the Federal Transit Administration awarded Pittsburgh Regional Transit $8 million to construct accessible platforms at ten Red Line stops, including Hampshire.
