= Westfield station (Pittsburgh) =

Westfield
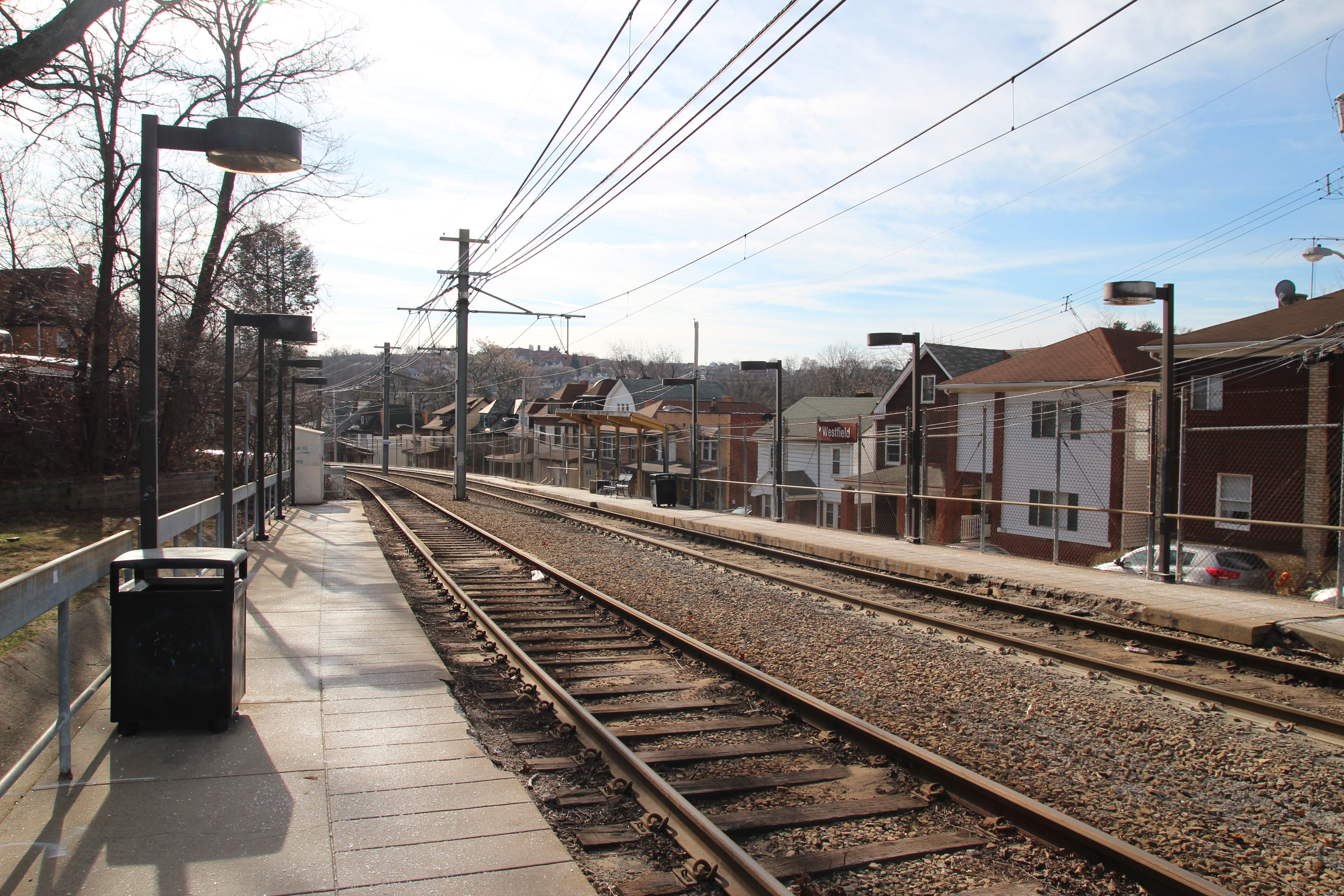
- Looking southeast

General information
- Location: Westfield Street and Suburban Avenue; Pittsburgh, Pennsylvania
- Coordinates: 40°24′37″N 80°01′12″W
- Owner: Pittsburgh Regional Transit
- Platforms: 2 side platforms
- Tracks: 2

Construction
- Accessible: No, under construction

History
- Opened: May 22, 1987

Passengers
- 2018: 185 (weekday boardings)

Services
Preceding station	Pittsburgh Regional Transit	Following station
Dawn toward Allegheny	Red Line	Fallowfield toward South Hills Village
Former services
Preceding station	Port Authority of Allegheny County	Following station
Pennant Closed 2021 toward Allegheny	Red Line	Fallowfield toward South Hills Village
Location

Westfield station is a station on Pittsburgh Regional Transit's light rail network, located in the Beechview neighborhood of Pittsburgh, Pennsylvania. The street level stop serves a densely populated residential area through which bus service is limited because of the hilly terrain.

In 2022, the Federal Transit Administration awarded Pittsburgh Regional Transit $28.4 million to construct accessible platforms at four Red Line stops, including Westfield.
