= Arlington station (Pittsburgh) =

Arlington
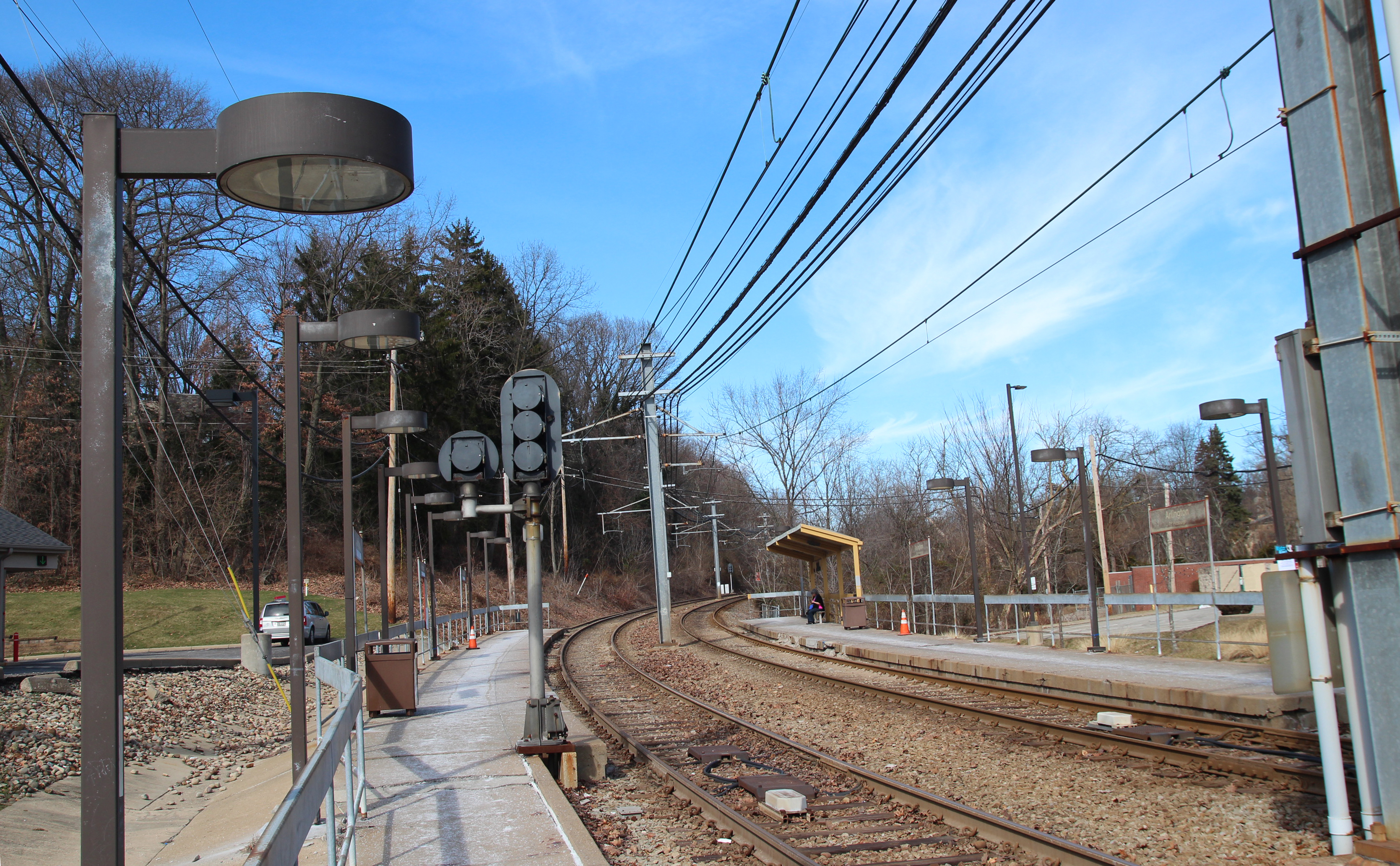
- View north from the outbound platform

General information
- Location: Mt. Lebanon Boulevard at Cooke Lane; Castle Shannon, Pennsylvania
- Coordinates: 40.3700°N 80.0334°W
- Owner: Pittsburgh Regional Transit
- Platforms: 2 side platforms
- Tracks: 2

Construction
- Structure type: At-grade
- Accessible: No, under construction

History
- Opened: May 22, 1987

Passengers
- 2018: 160 (weekday boardings)

Services
Preceding station	Pittsburgh Regional Transit	Following station
Poplar toward Allegheny	Red Line	Castle Shannon toward South Hills Village
Location

Arlington station is a station on Pittsburgh Regional Transit's light rail network, located in Castle Shannon, Pennsylvania. The street level stop is designed to serve a nearby commercial strip, providing access for local residents to businesses along Mt. Lebanon Boulevard. Nearby Cooke Drive is also lined with apartments, allowing local light rail access for residents of these dwellings.

In May 2024, the Federal Transit Administration awarded Pittsburgh Regional Transit $8 million to construct accessible platforms at ten stops, including Arlington.
