= Fallowfield station =

Fallowfield station could refer to:

- Fallowfield station (Ontario), a railway and bus rapid transit station in Ottawa, Ontario
- Fallowfield station (PAAC), a light rail station in Pittsburgh, Pennsylvania
- Fallowfield railway station, a disused railway station in Manchester, England
