= Fallowfield station (Pittsburgh) =

Fallowfield
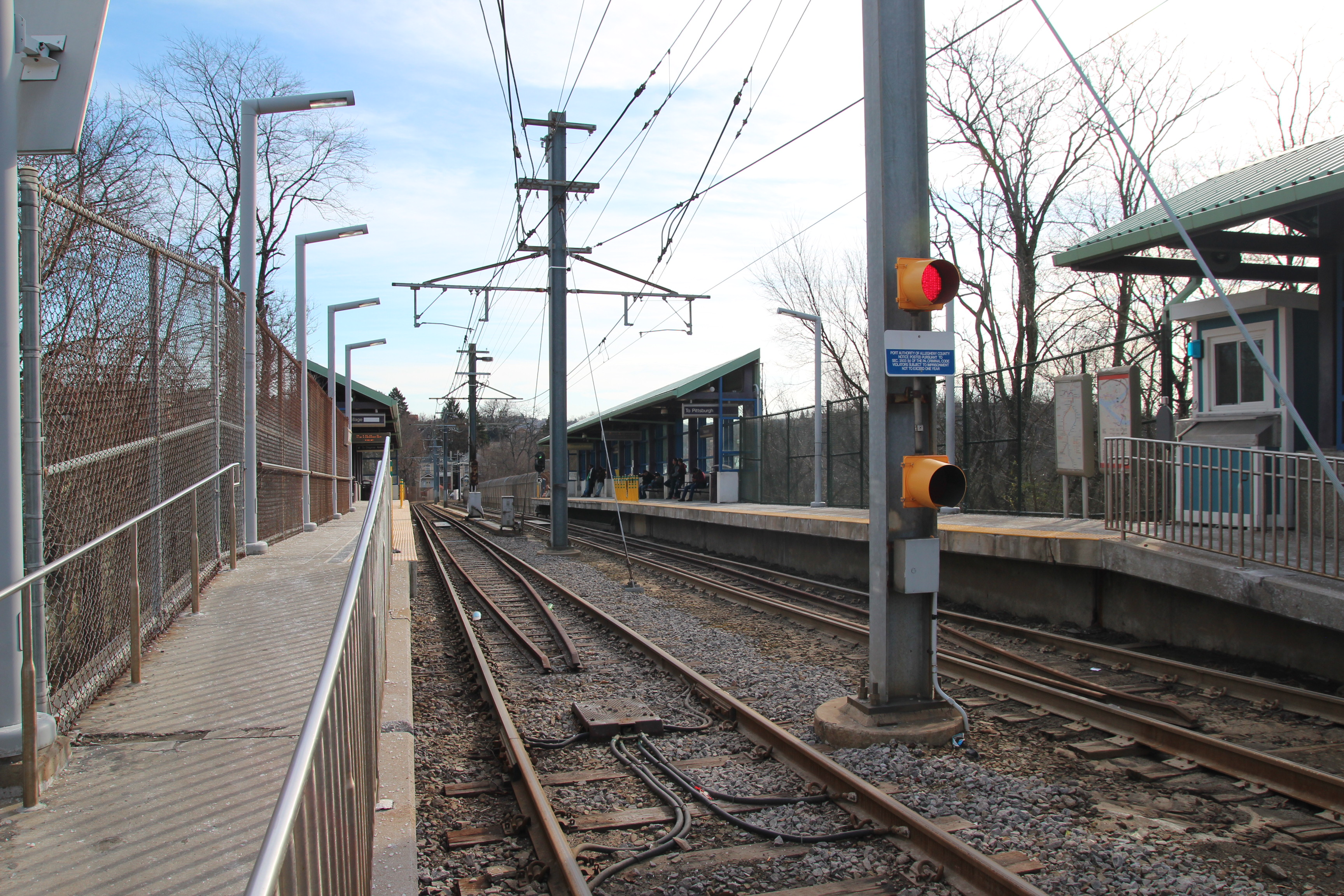

General information
- Location: Broadway Avenue and Fallowfield Avenue; Pittsburgh, Pennsylvania
- Coordinates: 40.4112°N 80.0232°W
- Owner: Pittsburgh Regional Transit
- Platforms: 2 side platforms
- Tracks: 2

Construction
- Accessible: Yes

History
- Opened: May 22, 1987

Passengers
- 2018: 253 (weekday boardings)

Services
Preceding station	Pittsburgh Regional Transit	Following station
Westfield toward Allegheny	Red Line	Hampshire toward South Hills Village
Location

Fallowfield is a station on Pittsburgh Regional Transit's light rail network in the Beechview neighborhood of Pittsburgh, Pennsylvania. The high level stop is located at the end of Broadway Avenue, built where the tracks transition from a street to a private right-of-way. The station serves a densely populated residential area through which bus service is limited because of the hilly terrain. Although a high level stop, there is no fare booth, so passengers must board or alight from the first car of a two car train.
