= Allegheny County Alcoholic Beverage Tax =

The Allegheny County Alcoholic Beverage Tax is a county tax on retail sale of alcoholic beverages within Allegheny County, Pennsylvania.

The tax, a 10% levy on served alcohol, was passed by the Allegheny County Council and signed into law by Dan Onorato, Allegheny County's Chief Executive on December 4, 2007. On January 1, 2009, the tax rate was reduced to 7%. The tax is collected at the point of sale by restaurants and bars and is collected by Allegheny County Treasurer on a monthly basis. The funds were dedicated to fund the Port Authority of Allegheny County.

The tax encountered significant resistance and spawned an organized advocacy group called Friends Against Counter-Productive Taxation (FACT). The organization was able to have a referendum placed on the ballot to lower the drink tax, but it was overturned by the Pennsylvania Supreme Court. In 2009, Pittsburgh Mayor Luke Ravenstahl expressed a desire to acquire a portion of this tax for the city's failing pension system, a possibility that Allegheny County officials opposed, citing that the state law authorizing the tax required the money to be directed towards the Port Authority of Allegheny County.
