= Red Line (Pittsburgh) =

Light rail line in Pittsburgh, Pennsylvania

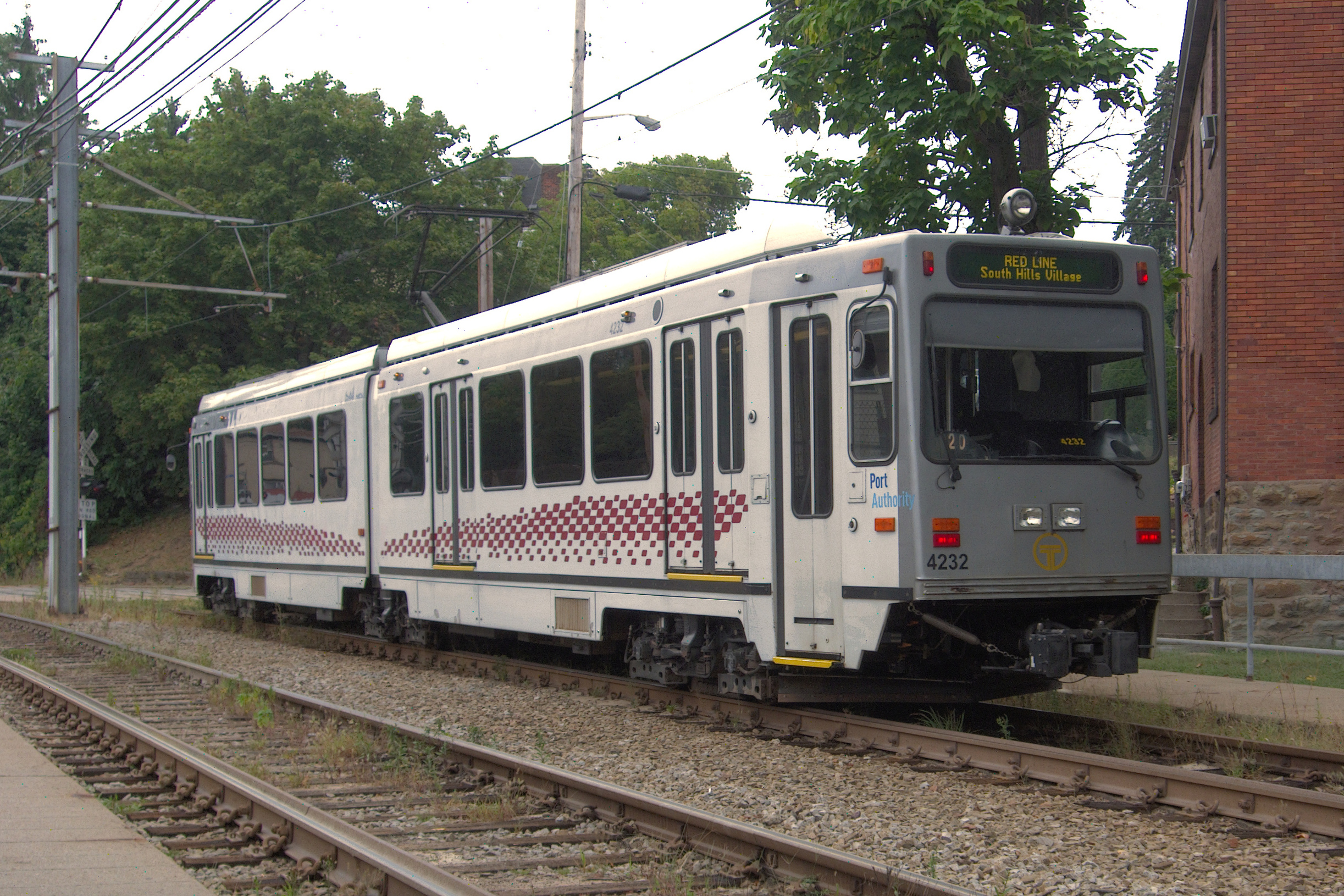
- Southbound Red Line train at Westfield, September 2015

Overview
- Other name: 42S South Hills Village via Beechview
- Owner: Pittsburgh Regional Transit
- Locale: Pittsburgh
- Termini: Allegheny; South Hills Village
- Stations: 31

Service
- Type: Light rail
- System: Pittsburgh Light Rail
- Depot: South Hills Village Rail Center
- Rolling stock: Siemens SD-400; CAF LRV
- Daily ridership: 10,038 (2025)

Technical
- Track gauge: 5 ft 2 1/2 in (1,588 mm) Pennsylvania trolley gauge
- Electrification: Overhead line, 650 V DC
Route map
Red Line highlighted in red
Key

The Red Line is a line on the Pittsburgh Light Rail system that runs between South Hills Village and Downtown Pittsburgh via the Beechview neighborhood. The companion route, the Blue Line, branches off north of Martin Villa – which closed in 2012 – and runs through Overbrook. In March 2007, the closure of the Palm Garden Bridge for refurbishment suspended the Red Line for five months; it resumed service in September.

== Route ==
The line begins at South Hills Village in Upper St. Clair, and runs north to Washington Junction through Bethel Park, providing a transfer to the Blue Line - Library, which runs via Overbrook. The Red Line continues north through Castle Shannon and Mount Lebanon, then through the Mount Lebanon Rail Tunnel underneath Washington Road/West Liberty Avenue (aka Truck U.S. Route 19) into Dormont at the other end. The first station coming out of the tunnel northbound is Dormont Junction, then line proceeds through this suburb, crossing many streets via grade crossings. The line then arrives at Potomac, where it begins travelling through street trackage about a quarter mile down the tracks, crossing into the neighborhood of Beechview in the city of Pittsburgh near the former Neeld Avenue stop.

Before the Mt. Lebanon Rail Tunnel, the old streetcars ran with car traffic on Washington Road between Alfred Street in Mt. Lebanon and the intersection of McFarland Road and Raleigh Avenue (where Washington Road becomes West Liberty Avenue) in Dormont.

At South Hills Junction the Red Line rejoins the Blue Line and the Brown Line, which runs over Mount Washington through the Allentown neighborhood. The Red Line runs through the Mount Washington Transit Tunnel, stopping at Station Square before crossing the Monongahela River on the Panhandle Bridge. Reaching downtown at First Avenue, the Red Line proceeds underground to Steel Plaza, Wood Street and Gateway Center. Upon reaching Gateway, the route then proceeds under the Allegheny River and makes additional stops at North Side and Allegheny stations on the North Shore.

Pittsburgh Regional Transit closed seven stations along the Red Line on June 25, 2012: Santa Barbara, Martin Villa, Kelton, Neeld, Boustead, Coast and Traymore. An additional station, Pennant, was closed on February 15, 2021, due to safety concerns. The line was renamed slightly to Red Line - Castle Shannon via Beechview when the North Shore Connector opened.

In December 2022 and May 2024, the Federal Transit Administration awarded PRT a total of $36.4 million to make improvements at 14 of the 15 Red Line stops that are not accessible. The Westfield, St. Anne and Bethel Village stops will be converted into fully-accessible high platform stations. The other 11 stations will receive more limited upgrades but will still have level boarding with rail vehicles. PRT determined Belasco station was unable to be modified to have level boarding.

== Stations ==
The Pittsburgh Light Rail has three types of stations. They are low platform, high platform, and underground. High platform and underground stations are wheelchair accessible as the train doors are level with the platform. Low platform stations are not wheelchair accessible as they require passengers to climb stairs to board the light rail vehicle.

Name	Miles	Disabled access	Type	Other services	City (Neighborhood)
Allegheny	0.00	Disabled access	high platform	Blue Silver	Pittsburgh (Chateau)
North Side	0.51	Disabled access	underground	Blue Silver	Pittsburgh (North Shore)
Gateway	1.00	Disabled access	underground	Blue Silver	Pittsburgh (Downtown)
Wood Street	1.26	Disabled access	underground	Blue Silver	Pittsburgh (Downtown)
Steel Plaza	1.55	Disabled access	underground	Blue Silver	Pittsburgh (Downtown)
First Avenue	1.88	Disabled access	high platform	Blue Silver	Pittsburgh (Downtown)
Station Square	2.41	Disabled access	high platform	Blue Silver South Busway; Monongahela Incline	Pittsburgh (South Shore)
South Hills Junction	3.25	Disabled access	high platform	Blue Silver South Busway	Pittsburgh (Mt. Washington)
Palm Garden	3.67	#	low platform	South Busway	Pittsburgh (Mt. Washington)
Dawn	3.90	#	low platform	South Busway	Pittsburgh (Beechview)
Westfield	4.37	#	low platform		Pittsburgh (Beechview)
Fallowfield	4.72	Disabled access	high platform		Pittsburgh (Beechview)
Hampshire	4.79	#	low platform		Pittsburgh (Beechview)
Belasco	5.09		low platform		Pittsburgh (Beechview)
Shiras	5.39	#	low platform		Pittsburgh (Beechview)
Stevenson	5.75	#	low platform		Dormont
Potomac	5.97	Disabled access	high platform		Dormont
Dormont Junction	6.45	Disabled access	high platform		Dormont
Mt. Lebanon	7.11	Disabled access	high platform		Mt. Lebanon
Poplar	7.68	#	low platform		Mt. Lebanon
Arlington	8.15	#	low platform		Castle Shannon
Castle Shannon	8.36	Disabled access	high platform		Castle Shannon
Overbrook Junction	8.59	Disabled access	high platform		Castle Shannon
St. Anne's	8.97	#	low platform	Blue Silver	Castle Shannon
Smith Road	9.25	#	low platform	Blue Silver	Castle Shannon
Washington Junction	9.49	Disabled access	high platform	Blue Silver	Bethel Park
Casswell	9.96	#	low platform	Blue	Bethel Park
Highland	10.27	#	low platform	Blue	Bethel Park
Bethel Village	10.75	#	low platform	Blue	Bethel Park
Dorchester	11.04	#	low platform	Blue	Bethel Park
South Hills Village	11.31	Disabled access	high platform	Blue	Upper St. Clair
