= Beechview (Pittsburgh) =

- Neighborhood
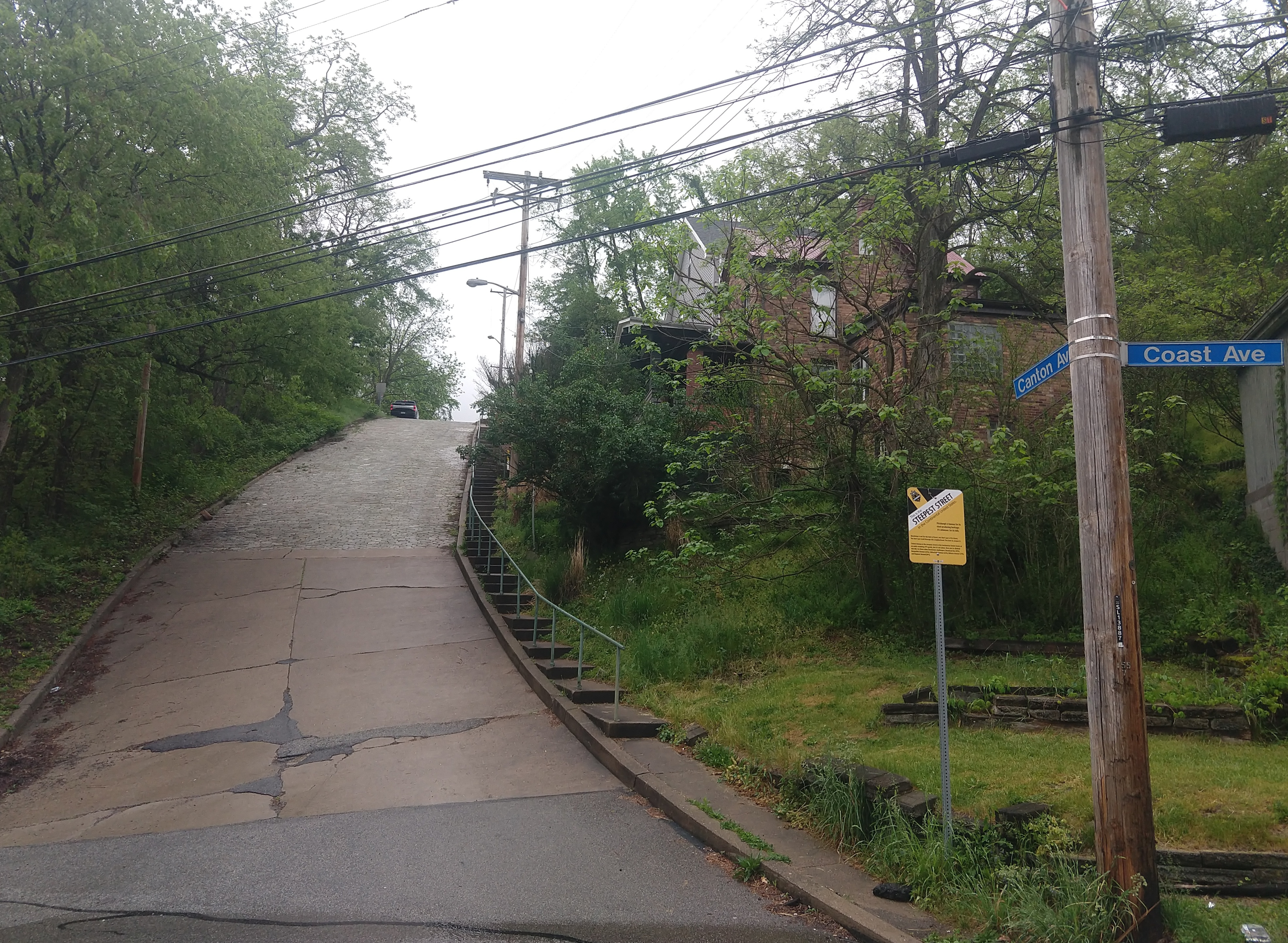
- Canton Avenue, the steepest street in the country, in Beechview

- Coordinates: 40.413687°N 80.022433°W
- Country: United States
- State: Pennsylvania
- County: Allegheny County
- City: Pittsburgh
- Incorporated: 28 July 1905
- Named for: Fagus grandifolia (American Beech)

Area
  - Total: 1.46 sq mi (3.8 km^{2})

Population (2020)
  - Total: 7,596
  - Density: 5,200/sq mi (2,010/km^{2})

Beechview is a neighborhood in Pittsburgh, Pennsylvania's southwestern side. It has a zip code of 15216, and has representation on Pittsburgh City Council by both the council member for District 4 (South Neighborhoods) and for District 2 (West Neighborhoods). Beechview was founded in 1905 after the introduction of a comprehensive light rail transit system. It was named for the large amount of American Beech Trees in the area. It is Pittsburgh Fire Bureau Zone 4-10 and houses Engine Company #28. It is located in Zone 6 for Pittsburgh Police. While Beechview took an economic downturn in the late 20th century, its proximity to downtown Pittsburgh, convenient access to light rail transit, sweeping vistas and new businesses have allowed Beechview to stabilize economically.

Historical population
Year	Pop.	±%
1940	10,853	—
1950	11,994	+10.5%
1960	14,032	+17.0%
1970	14,360	+2.3%
1980	11,911	−17.1%
1990	9,311	−21.8%
2000	8,772	−5.8%
2010	7,974	−9.1%
2020	7,596	−4.7%
Source: University of Pittsburgh

== Geography ==
Despite Beechview's hilly terrain, its streets follow a grid pattern, resulting in some extremely steep roads. This includes Canton Avenue, the steepest street in the U.S., at a 37% grade.

== Surrounding and adjacent neighborhoods ==
Beechview has six borders, including the Pittsburgh neighborhoods of Duquesne Heights to the north, Mt. Washington to the northeast, Brookline to the south and southeast, Banksville to the west, and Ridgemont to the northwest (separated by the Parkway West I-376). The borough of Dormont borders Beechview from the southwest.

== Transportation ==
Beechview is served by the Dawn, Westfield, Fallowfield, Hampshire, Belasco and Shiras Pittsburgh Light Rail Red Line stations.

== See also ==
- List of Pittsburgh neighborhoods
