= Pittsburgh Regional Transit =

Public transit agency in Pennsylvania, US

Port Authority of Allegheny County Pittsburgh Regional Transit

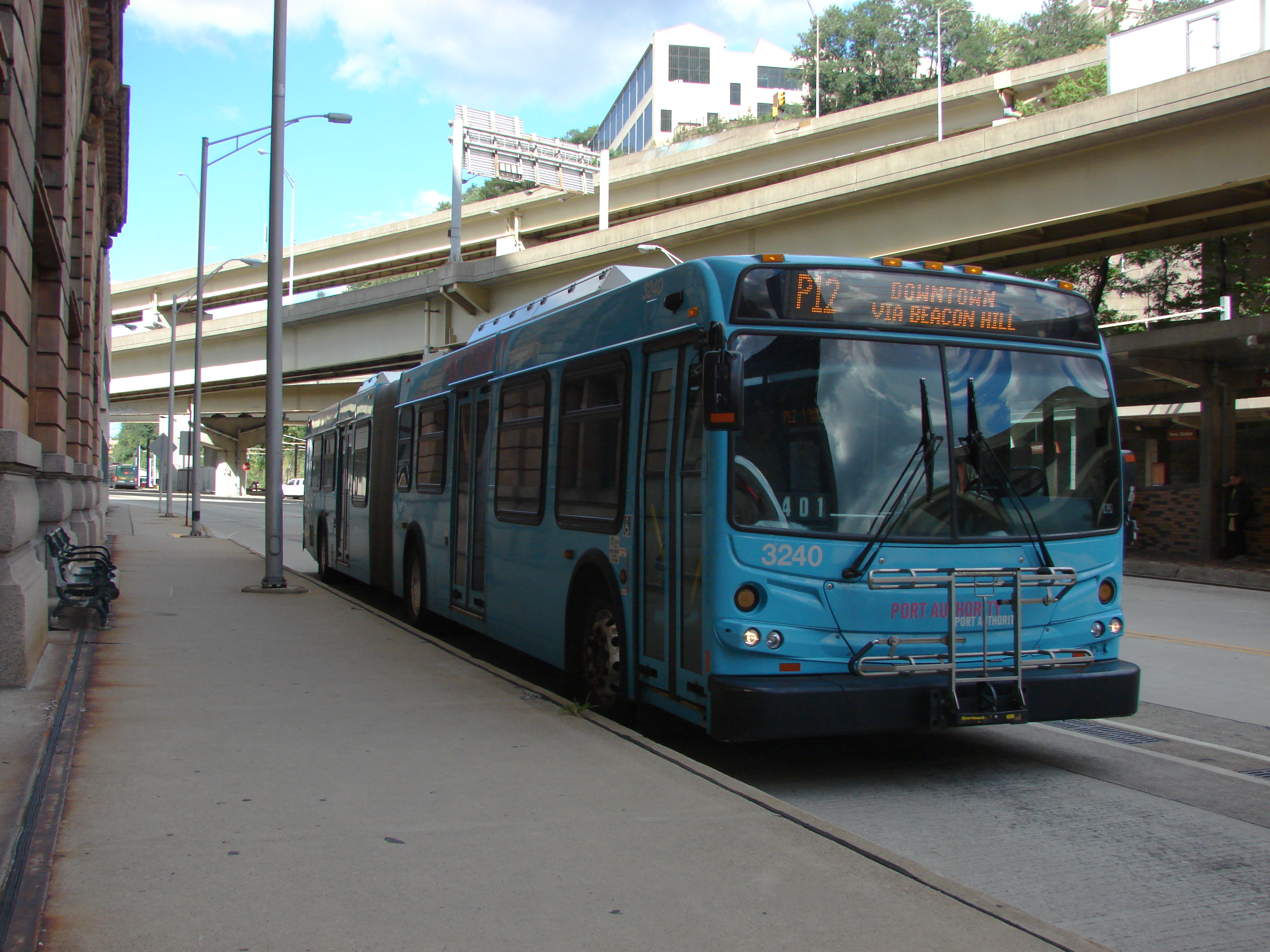
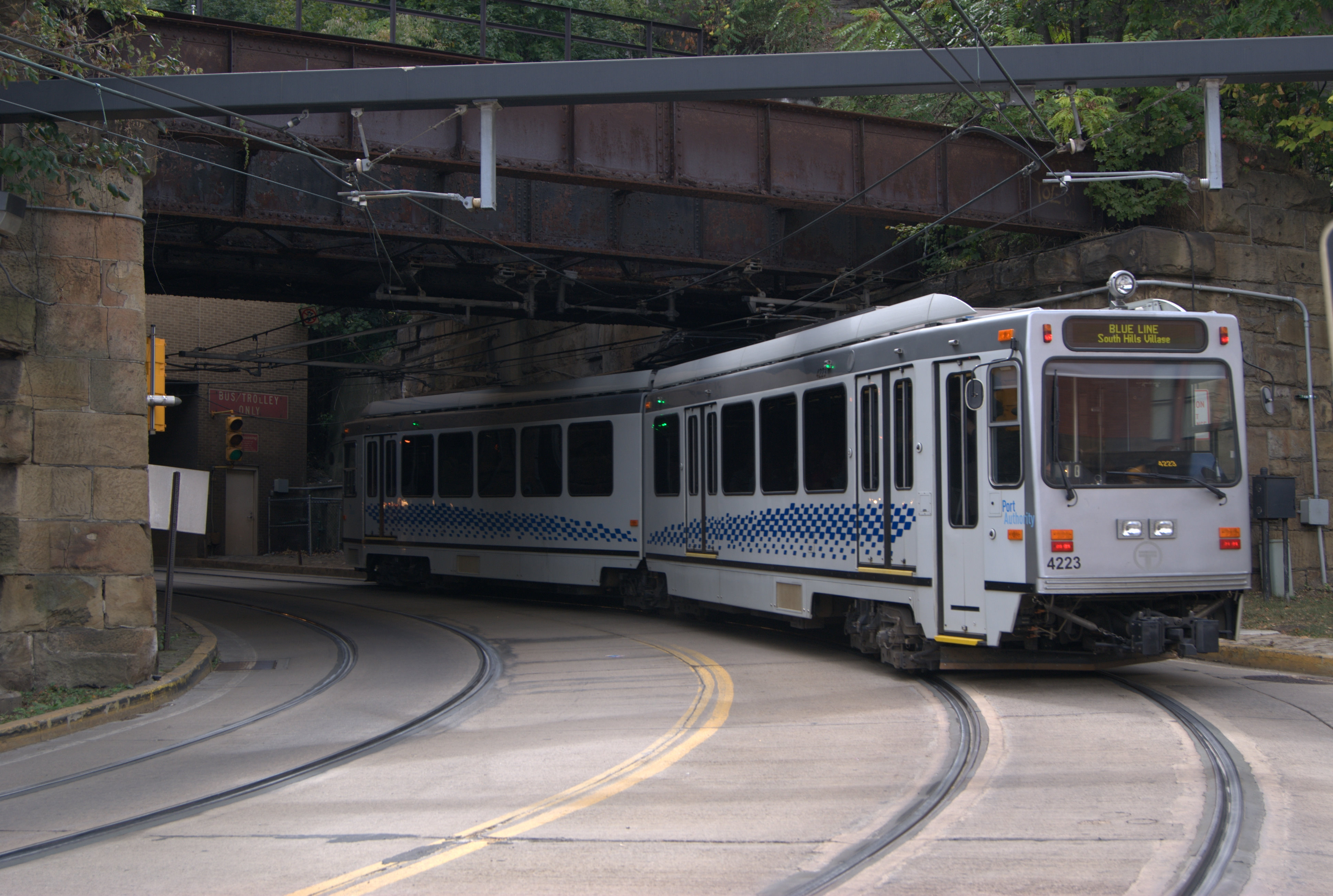
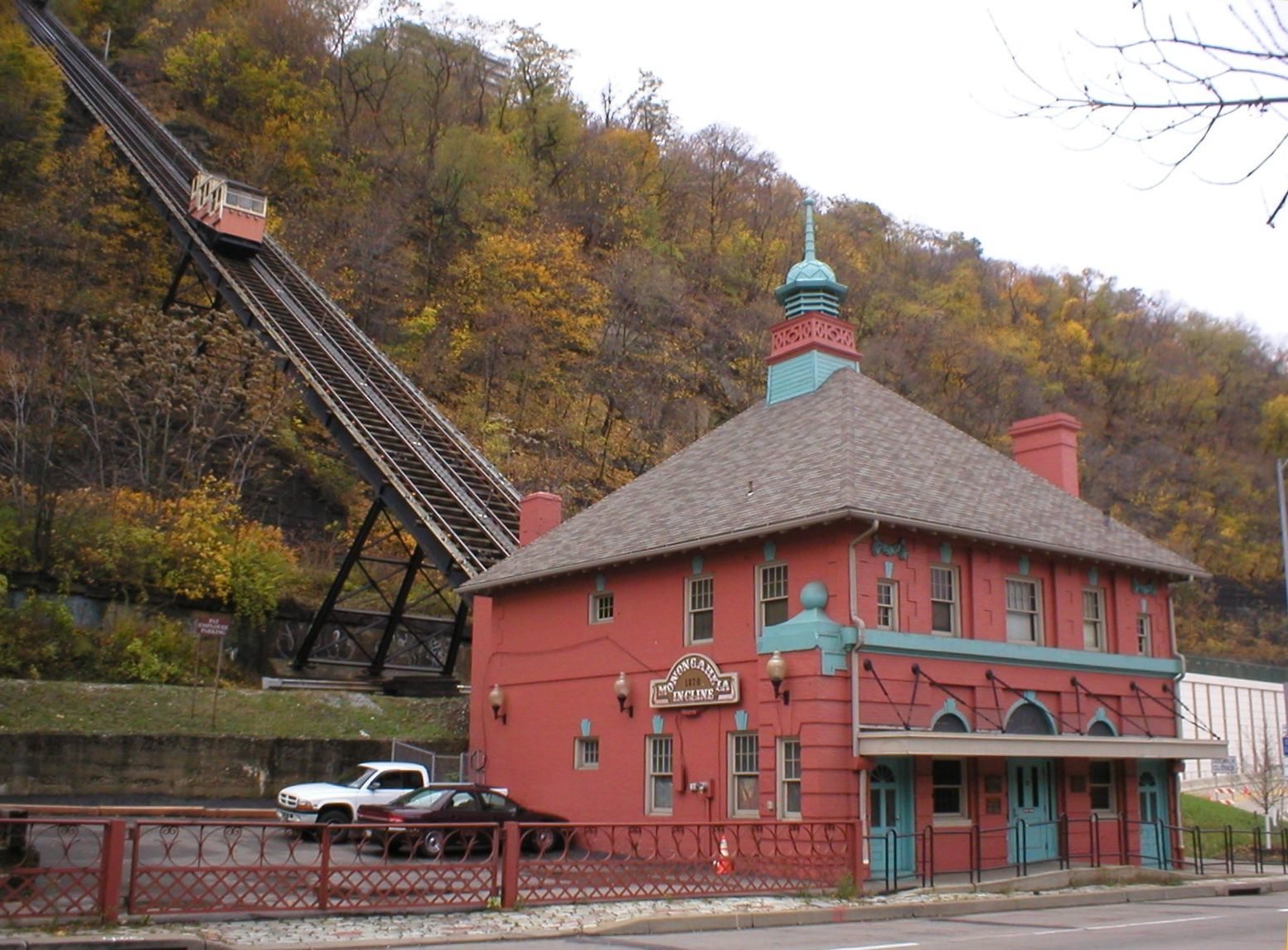
- PRT's three service types: bus, light rail, and incline
- Parent: Allegheny County Government
- Founded: March 1, 1964
- Headquarters: Pittsburgh, Pennsylvania, U.S.
- Service area: Allegheny County and bordering portions of Beaver, Washington, and Westmoreland counties
- Service type: Bus, bus rapid transit, light rail, incline (funicular)
- Stations: 53 light rail, 28 busway, 4 funicular
- Fleet: 700+ buses, 76 light rail vehicles, 4 funicular cars
- Annual ridership: 38,452,000 (2025)
- Fuel type: Ultra-low sulfur diesel, Diesel-electric Hybrid, Electric buses
- Chief executive: Katharine Eagan Kelleman
- Website: www.rideprt.org

The Port Authority of Allegheny County, doing business as Pittsburgh Regional Transit (PRT), is the public transit agency serving Allegheny County, Pennsylvania, including the city of Pittsburgh, with limited service to adjacent counties in the Greater Pittsburgh region.

PRT is the second-largest public transit agency in Pennsylvania and, as of 2022, was the 20th-largest in the United States. It operates a system of bus, light rail, and incline services. The agency was established in 1956 and began transit operations in 1964. In 1977, it opened the South Busway, one of the earliest bus rapid transit corridors in the United States; the network has since expanded to include the East and West busways, which remain a core part of the system. The agency also operates the Wabash Tunnel, 43 park-and-ride facilities, and more than 80 bridges. In 2025, the system recorded 38,452,000 passenger trips.

The agency adopted the Pittsburgh Regional Transit name for public use in 2022 while retaining its legal name. It is constituted as a port authority under Pennsylvania law and is funded by federal, state, and local sources. Governance is provided by a board of directors appointed by Allegheny County, the Pennsylvania General Assembly, and the Governor of Pennsylvania. The agency is led by a chief executive officer, and its headquarters are located in the Heinz 57 Center in Downtown Pittsburgh.

== History ==
Pittsburgh Regional Transit was established as the Port Authority of Allegheny County by the Pennsylvania General Assembly in 1956. The agency was initially intended to oversee port facilities in the Pittsburgh area and used the abbreviation "PAT". In 1959, the enabling legislation was amended to permit the acquisition of privately owned transit operators, including the Pittsburgh Railways Company and 32 independent bus and incline operations. The consolidation brought together systems with separate fare structures, labor agreements, and, in some cases, overlapping routes, at a time when ridership had declined.

On April 19, 1963, the Board of Allegheny County Commissioners authorized the acquisition of these transit companies for approximately $12 million. Port Authority Transit began service on March 1, 1964.

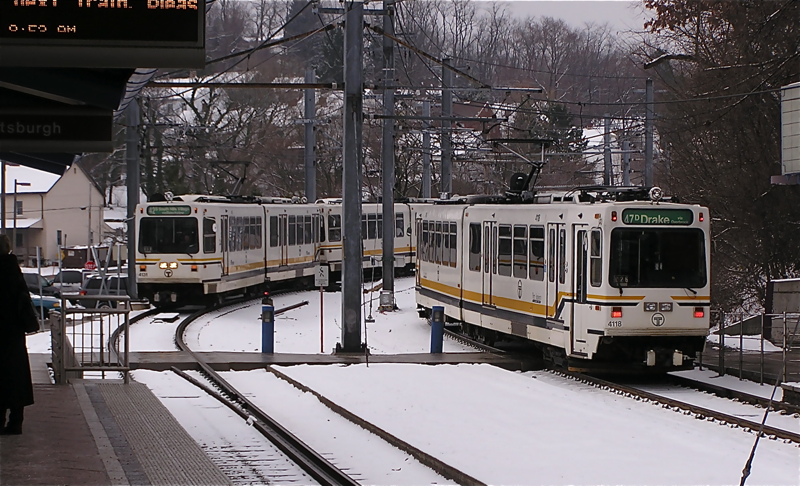
Port Authority light rail train at Washington Junction station, March 2005

Following the start of service, new buses were introduced to replace vehicles inherited from predecessor companies, and a unified route numbering system and fare structure were implemented. The agency undertook a broader program to consolidate and modernize operations. Most streetcar routes were converted to bus service, reflecting lower operating and maintenance costs. By the early 1970s, only a limited number of streetcar lines remained, primarily those using the Mount Washington Transit Tunnel to reach the South Hills on private rights-of-way.

During the late 1960s and early 1970s, the Port Authority developed plans for new fixed-guideway transit, including busways and a proposed automated system known as Skybus. The proposal was not implemented following public opposition.

In the early 1970s, the agency expanded bus service and introduced new routes, including service to Oakland. In 1975, it assumed operation of a Baltimore and Ohio Railroad commuter rail line to Versailles, branded as PATrain. Ridership increased during this period, influenced in part by the 1973 oil crisis. Fare increases and a brief strike occurred in 1976. The South Busway opened in 1977.

Planning shifted in the late 1970s toward reconstruction of the remaining streetcar lines as a modern light rail system. Construction began in 1980 on a project that included a downtown subway, upgrades to the Beechview line, and a branch to South Hills Village. The first segment of the modern light rail system opened in 1984, followed by the downtown subway in 1985, replacing street-running service through downtown. The initial phase of the light rail system was completed in 1987.

During the 1980s, ridership declined as fuel prices decreased and the regional population fell following the decline of the steel industry. The agency reduced fares during the mid-1980s and acquired additional buses. Commuter rail service to Versailles ended in 1989.

A four-week labor strike occurred in 1992. In 1993, the Overbrook light rail line was closed due to deteriorated infrastructure. It reopened in 2004 following reconstruction, which included full modernization and improved accessibility.

The West Busway opened in 2000. An extension of the East Busway opened in 2003. In 2012, the North Shore Connector opened, extending light rail service under the Allegheny River to the North Shore.

By the mid-2000s, the agency faced a budget deficit and implemented service reductions in June 2007. In 2008, Allegheny County Chief Executive Dan Onorato introduced a 10% Allegheny County Alcoholic Beverage Tax to provide funding.

Between 2007 and 2010, the Port Authority reduced expenses and increased revenue while addressing a statewide funding shortfall. In November 2010, the board approved service reductions and fare increases implemented in 2011.

In 2013, the Pennsylvania legislature enacted Act 89, providing dedicated transportation funding.

In June 2022, the Port Authority of Allegheny County adopted the public-facing name Pittsburgh Regional Transit while retaining its legal name.

== Fare structure ==
Pittsburgh Regional Transit uses a flat-fare system, with payment accepted via smart card or cash. Transfers are time-based and valid across modes.

In 2017, the agency replaced its zone-based fare structure with a simplified flat fare, eliminating distance-based pricing and standardizing payment upon boarding. The change also ended the "pay-on-entry/pay-on-exit" system and discontinued the downtown free-fare zone on buses. The "pay-on-entry/pay-on-exit" system and the Downtown/North Shore free-fare zone remain in use on the light rail system.

PRT introduced its smart card fare collection system, known as ConnectCard, in the early 2010s, reducing reliance on paper tickets and cash payments. Discounted fares are available for seniors, people with disabilities, and youth, and passes are offered for frequent riders.

== Light rail ==
Pittsburgh Light Rail system logo

Pittsburgh Regional Transit operates a 26-mile (42 km) light rail system called the "T" from downtown subway stations to neighborhoods and suburbs south of the city on surface tracks with right-of-way. In 2025, the light rail lines carried a combined 3,104,400 passengers.

The system comprises three lines, all of which have a northern terminus at Allegheny station on Pittsburgh's North Shore near Acrisure Stadium and the Carnegie Science Center:

- The Red Line runs through Beechview, Dormont, Mt. Lebanon, Castle Shannon, and Bethel Park before terminating at South Hills Village.
- The Blue Line runs through Knoxville, Overbrook, Castle Shannon, and Bethel Park before terminating at South Hills Village.
- The Silver Line runs through Knoxville, Overbrook, Castle Shannon, Bethel Park and South Park before terminating at Library.

== Funiculars ==
Pittsburgh's mass transit system includes two funiculars, locally known as "inclines": the Duquesne Incline and the Monongahela Incline. Both operate between the top of Mount Washington and its base along the Monongahela River, opposite Downtown Pittsburgh. In 2025, the two inclines carried a combined 855,200 passengers.

Both inclines are owned by Pittsburgh Regional Transit. The Monongahela Incline is operated directly by the agency, while the Duquesne Incline is operated by the Society for the Preservation of the Duquesne Heights Incline, a nonprofit organization.

== Buses ==
Pittsburgh Regional Transit's bus system serves Allegheny County, with limited service extending into portions of Beaver, Butler, and Westmoreland counties. The system consists of 95 routes, including 28X flyer

Neighboring counties operate separate transit systems, some of which provide service to Downtown Pittsburgh with connections to Pittsburgh Regional Transit. In 2025, the system recorded 33,631,100 passenger trips.

PRT maintains a fleet of more than 700 buses powered by diesel, diesel-electric hybrid, and battery-electric propulsion.

=== Bus rapid transit ===
==== Busways ====
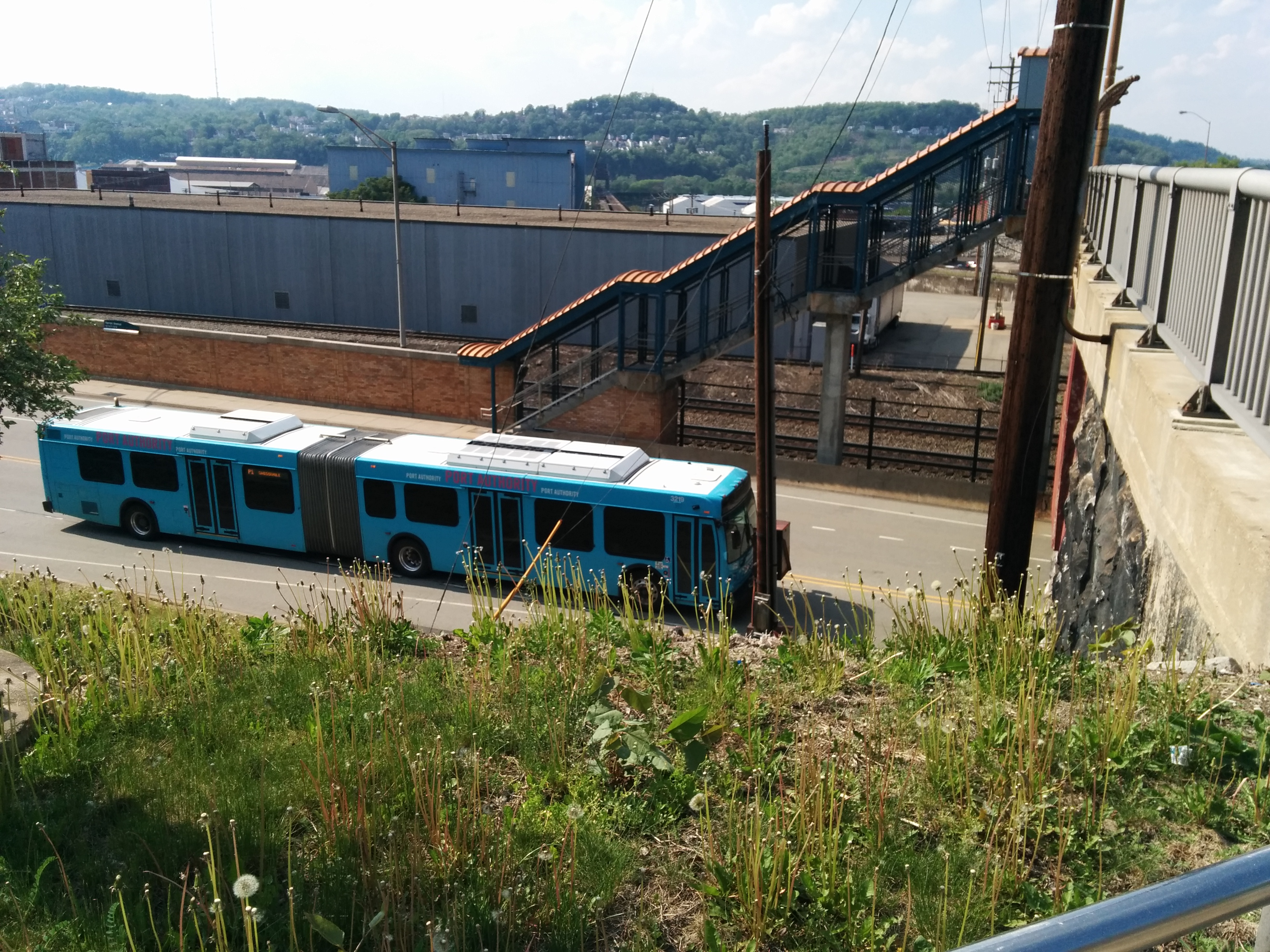
Herron station on the East Busway

Pittsburgh Regional Transit operates a network of busways that provide dedicated right-of-way for bus service, linking Downtown Pittsburgh with surrounding neighborhoods and suburbs.

The system comprises three busways:

- The South Busway is a 4.3-mile (6.9 km) corridor connecting downtown with the South Hills.
- The Martin Luther King Jr. East Busway is a 9.1-mile (14.6 km) corridor linking downtown with Swissvale, Wilkinsburg, Homewood and Rankin.
- The West Busway is a 5-mile (8.0 km) corridor providing service between downtown and Carnegie.

In addition, the reversible high-occupancy vehicle lanes on Interstate 279 provide a 5.3-mile (8.5 km) corridor used by express bus services connecting downtown with Ross and McCandless, functioning in practice as a north busway.

==== PRTX ====
Pittsburgh Regional Transit is also building PRTX, a network of bus only lanes on city streets. The initial corridor, known as the University Line, will connect downtown with Oakland. The line will use a combination of dedicated lanes and priority treatments along Fifth and Forbes avenues in Uptown and Oakland and Fifth and Sixth avenues in downtown. The corridor includes 23 stations with glass shelters and upgraded amenities like next-bus arrival screens and fare vending machines. Five routes will operate along the full corridor: P3, 61A, 61B, 61C, and 71B. Several other routes will use stations and facilities over parts of the corridor. Construction began in 2023 and is scheduled to continue through 2027.

== Other services ==
Pittsburgh Regional Transit owns and operates more than 40 park-and-ride facilities with over 14,000 parking spaces, as well as more than 80 bridges, including those on its busways and highway network. The agency also owns and operates the Wabash Tunnel, a vehicular tunnel.

PRT provides paratransit service through its ACCESS program, which offers shared-ride, door-to-door transportation for elderly and disabled passengers throughout Allegheny County. The service operates daily with advance reservations required.

== Future ==
=== Potential capital expansions ===
Several capital expansions have been proposed from various sources. The construction of a light rail line from Oakland to Pittsburgh International Airport has been proposed by County Executive Dan Onorato and former Congressman Mike Doyle, projected to cost about $3.5 billion. Doyle submitted a request to the Federal government to study the feasibility of the project.

== See also ==
- Port Authority Police Department
- List of rapid transit systems
- Paul Skoutelas
- Dennis Veraldi
- SEPTA
