= South Hills Village station =

Light rail station in Pittsburgh, United States

South Hills Village
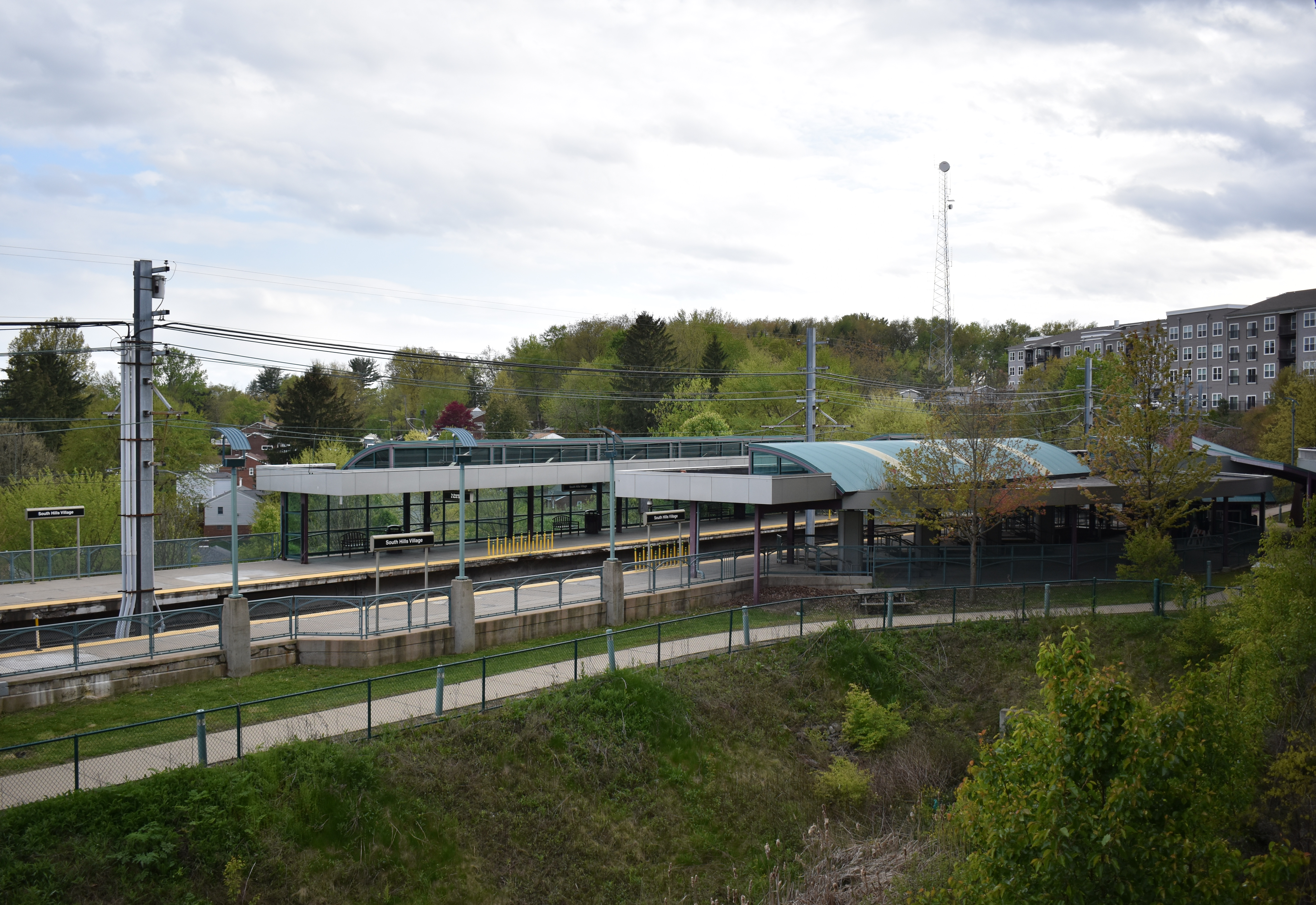
- South Hills Village station in 2020, taken overhead from the station's connected parking garage

General information
- Location: Village Drive and Fort Couch Road; Bethel Park, Pennsylvania
- Coordinates: 40.3393°N 80.0527°W
- Owner: Pittsburgh Regional Transit
- Line: South Hills Village Line
- Platforms: 2 side platforms
- Tracks: 2
- Connections: Pittsburgh Regional Transit: 36

Construction
- Structure type: At-grade
- Parking: 2,200 spaces
- Accessible: Yes

History
- Opened: April 15, 1984

Passengers
- 2018: 1,568 (weekday boardings)

Services
Preceding station	Pittsburgh Regional Transit	Following station
Dorchester toward Allegheny	Blue Line	Terminus
Dorchester toward Allegheny	Red Line	Terminus
Location

South Hills Village station is a station on Pittsburgh Regional Transit's light rail network. It is the southern terminus of both the Red and Blue lines. Port Authority's switching yard and shops are located just west of the station. The station is located in Bethel Park, Pennsylvania and is adjacent to the South Hills Village shopping complex.

A large 7-floor, 2,200 space parking garage was completed in 2004 at a cost of $21.6 million (equivalent to $36.8 million in 2025) and is located on site for commuters traveling from Pittsburgh's South Hills suburbs. The station itself is located at the center-back (south side) of the first floor of the garage. In addition to serving as a commuter stop, the site also handles much reverse flow traffic of shoppers from the city and more northerly suburbs.

== See also ==
- South Hills Village
