= Negley station =

Bus station in Pittsburgh

Negley
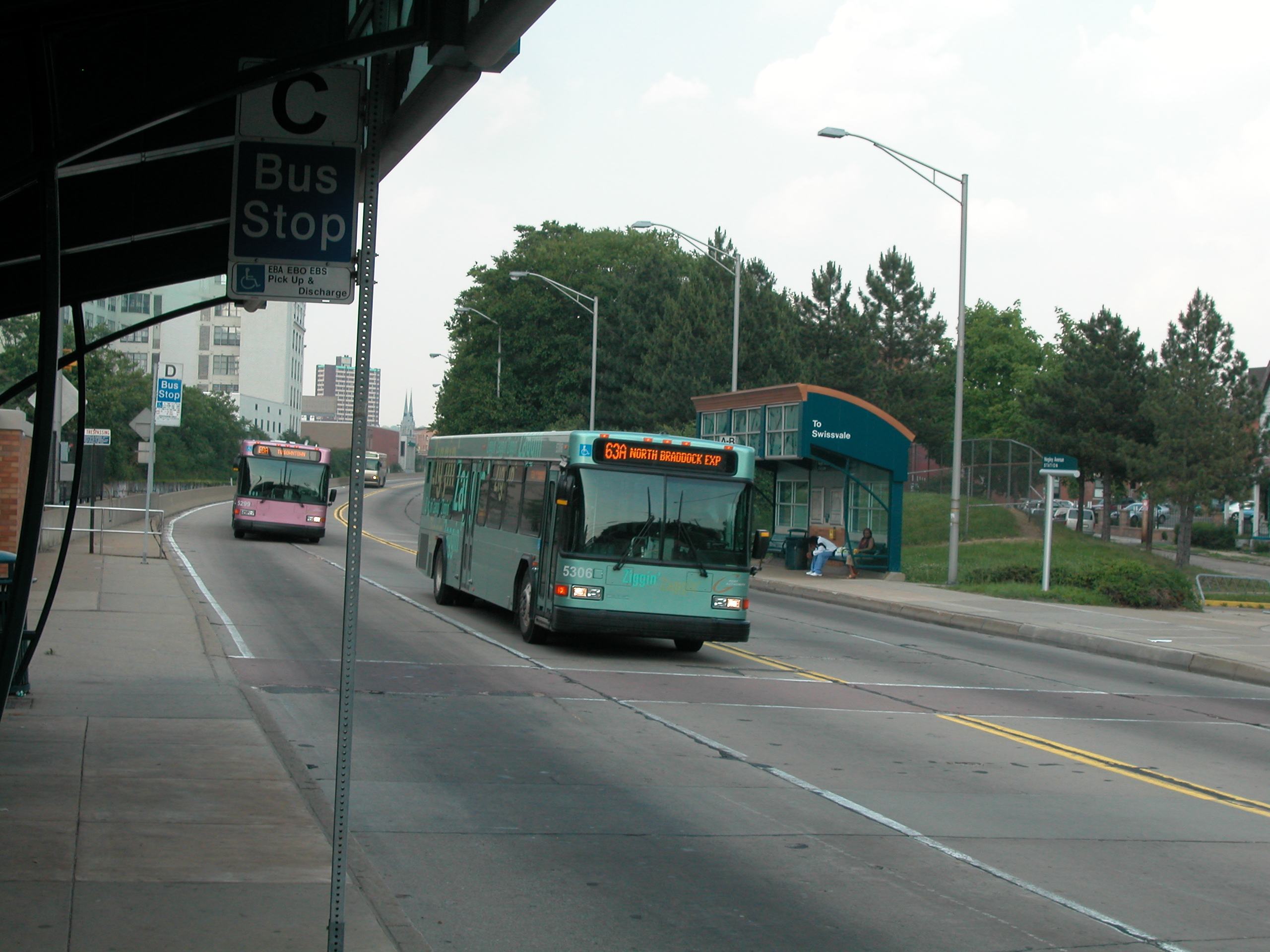

General information
- Coordinates: 40.4566°N 79.9326°W
- Operated by: Pittsburgh Regional Transit
- Line: East Busway

Construction
- Accessible: Yes

Passengers
- 2018: 1,227 (weekday boardings)

Services
Preceding station	Pittsburgh Regional Transit	Following station
Herron toward Penn Station	East Busway	East Liberty toward Swissvale or Hay Street
Location

Negley is a station on the East Busway, located in Shadyside and near the East Liberty and Friendship neighborhoods of Pittsburgh.

In 2022 and 2023, the Negley station was the first to be renovated in a plan to improve various Pittsburgh Regional Transit stations.
