= East Liberty station (Pittsburgh Regional Transit) =

East Liberty
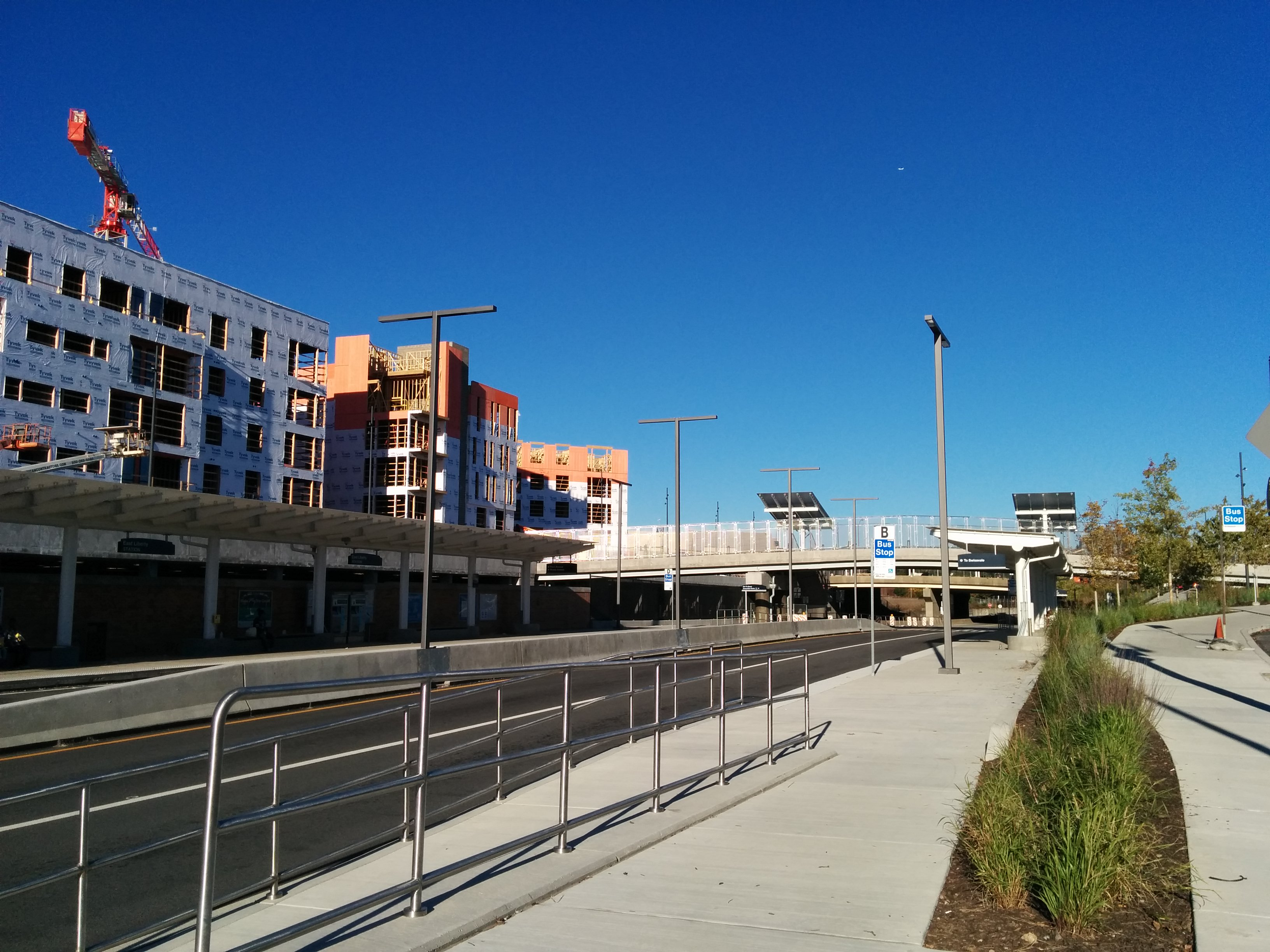

General information
- Coordinates: 40.4595°N 79.9227°W
- Operated by: Pittsburgh Regional Transit
- Line: East Busway

Construction
- Accessible: Yes

History
- Rebuilt: 2015

Passengers
- 2018: 1,966 (weekday boardings)

Services
Preceding station	Pittsburgh Regional Transit	Following station
Negley toward Penn Station	East Busway	Homewood toward Swissvale or Hay Street
Location

East Liberty is a station on the East Busway, located in East Liberty and near the Shadyside and Larimer neighborhoods of Pittsburgh.

In 2015, the station was rebuilt, as part of the East Liberty Transit Center.

== See also ==
- East Liberty Station
