= Homewood station (Pittsburgh Regional Transit) =

Railway station

Homewood
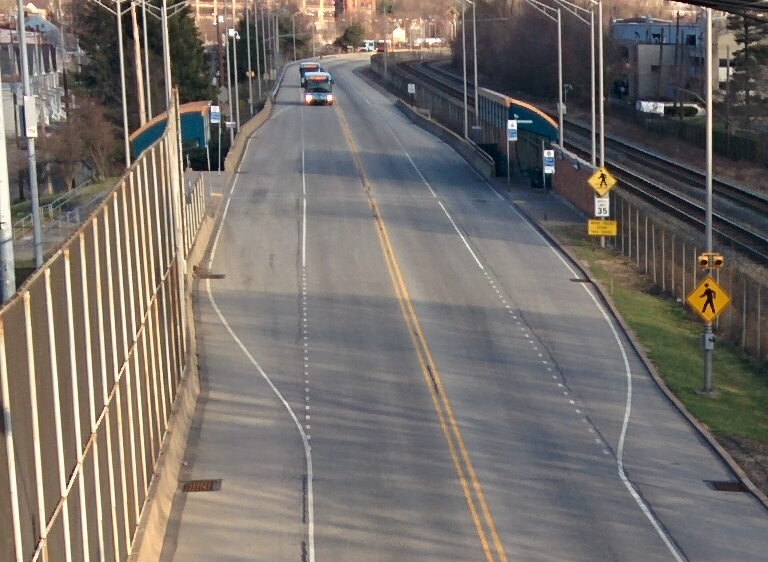

General information
- Coordinates: 40.4529°N 79.8991°W
- Operator: Pittsburgh Regional Transit
- Line: East Busway

Passengers
- 2018: 634 (weekday boardings)

Services
Preceding station	Pittsburgh Regional Transit	Following station
East Liberty toward Penn Station	East Busway	Wilkinsburg toward Swissvale or Hay Street
Location

Homewood is a station on the East Busway, located in Homewood and near the Point Breeze neighborhoods of Pittsburgh.
