= Wilkinsburg station (Pittsburgh Regional Transit) =

Wilkinsburg

General information
- Coordinates: 40.4467°N 79.8885°W
- Operated by: Pittsburgh Regional Transit
- Line: East Busway

Construction
- Parking: 748 spaces

Passengers
- 2018: 2,023 (weekday boardings)

Services
Preceding station	Pittsburgh Regional Transit	Following station
Homewood toward Penn Station	East Busway	Hamnett toward Swissvale
Homewood toward Penn Station	East Busway Hay Street Ramp	Hay Street Terminus
Location

Wilkinsburg is a station on the East Busway, located in Wilkinsburg.

There is a large park and ride lot next to the station.

== See also ==
- Pennsylvania Railroad Station-Wilkinsburg
