= Hamnett station =

Hamnett

General information
- Coordinates: 40.437°N 79.8856°W
- Operator: Pittsburgh Regional Transit
- Line: East Busway

Construction
- Parking: 128 spaces

Passengers
- 2018: 564 (weekday boardings)

Services
Preceding station	Pittsburgh Regional Transit	Following station
Wilkinsburg toward Penn Station	East Busway	Roslyn toward Swissvale
Location

Hamnett is a station on the East Busway, located in Wilkinsburg and near Edgewood.

There is a park and ride lot close to the station.
