= Herron station =

Herron

General information
- Coordinates: 40.4592°N 79.9668°W
- Operator: Pittsburgh Regional Transit
- Line: East Busway

Construction
- Accessible: Yes

Passengers
- 2018: 178 (weekday boardings)

Services
Preceding station	Pittsburgh Regional Transit	Following station
Penn Station Terminus	East Busway	Negley toward Swissvale or Hay Street
Location

Herron is a station on the East Busway, located between Polish Hill and Lawrenceville, and near the Strip District, in Pittsburgh. It is accessed via nearby Herron Avenue.
