= Wilkinsburg station =

Former train station in Wilkinsburg, Pennsylvania

Wilkinsburg, PA
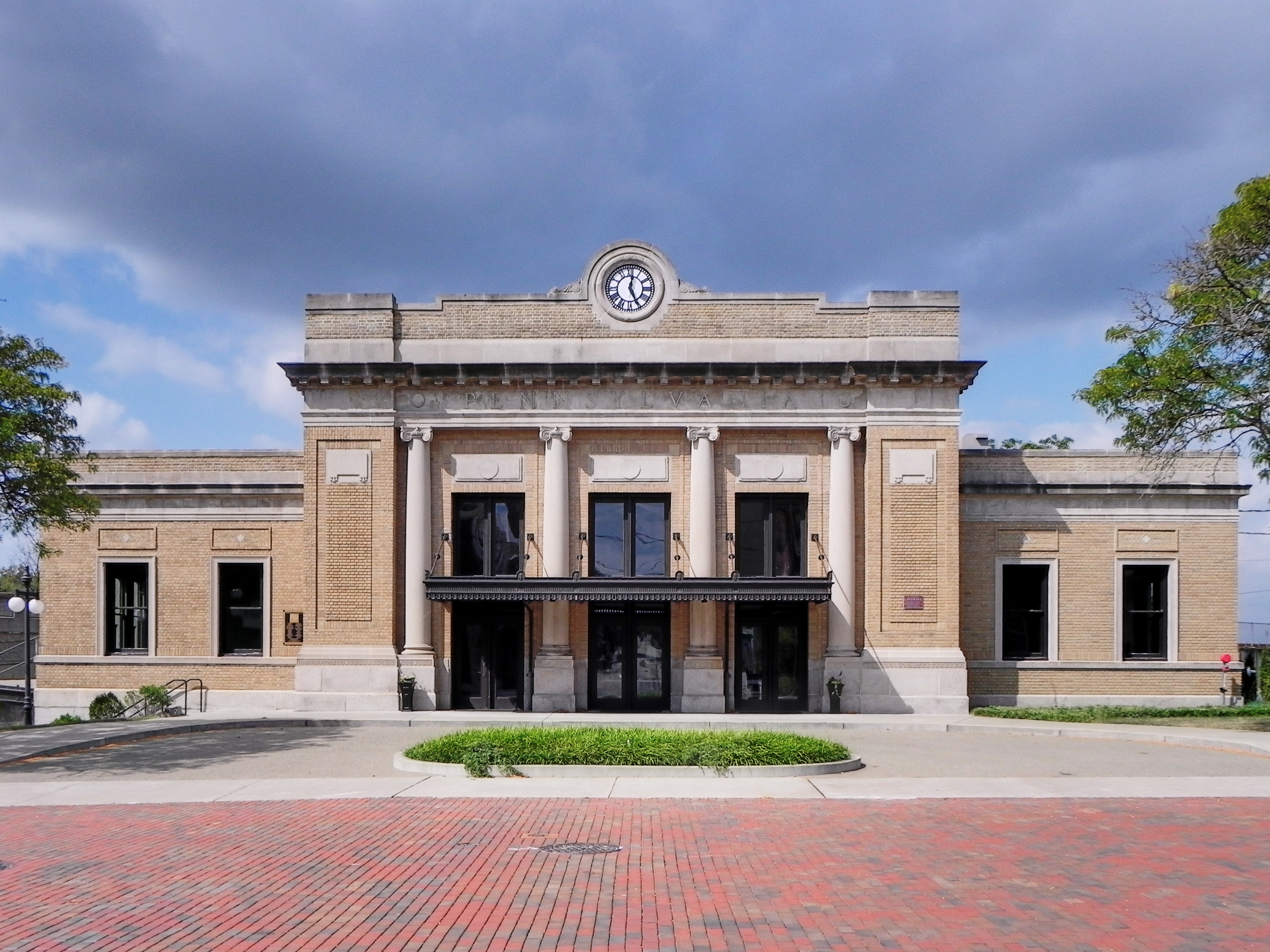
- The former station in 2025, after restoration

General information
- Line: Pittsburgh Line

History
- Closed: September 14, 1975

Former services
Preceding station	Amtrak	Following station
Pittsburgh toward Kansas City	National Limited	Greensburg toward New York or Washington, D.C.
Preceding station	Pennsylvania Railroad	Following station
East Liberty toward Chicago	Main Line	Braddock toward New York or Exchange Place
Brushton toward Pittsburgh	Pitcairn Local	Edgewood toward North Trafford
Preceding station	PennDOT	Following station
Pittsburgh Terminus	Parkway Limited	Swissvale toward Greensburg
- Pennsylvania Railroad Station-Wilkinsburg
- U.S. National Register of Historic Places
- Pittsburgh Landmark – PHLF
- Location within Pennsylvania Location within the United States
- Location: Hay St. at Ross Ave., Wilkinsburg, Pennsylvania
- Coordinates: 40°26′35″N 79°53′17″W
- Area: 0.5 acres (0.20 ha)
- Built: 1916
- Architect: Cookson, Walter H.
- Architectural style: Beaux Arts
- NRHP reference No.: 85001568

Significant dates
- Added to NRHP: July 18, 1985
- Designated PHLF: 1976
Location

Wilkinsburg station is a former train station located in Wilkinsburg, Pennsylvania. It was built by the Pennsylvania Railroad in 1916 and was last used in 1975. It was added to the National Register of Historic Places in 1985 as Pennsylvania Railroad Station-Wilkinsburg.

== History ==
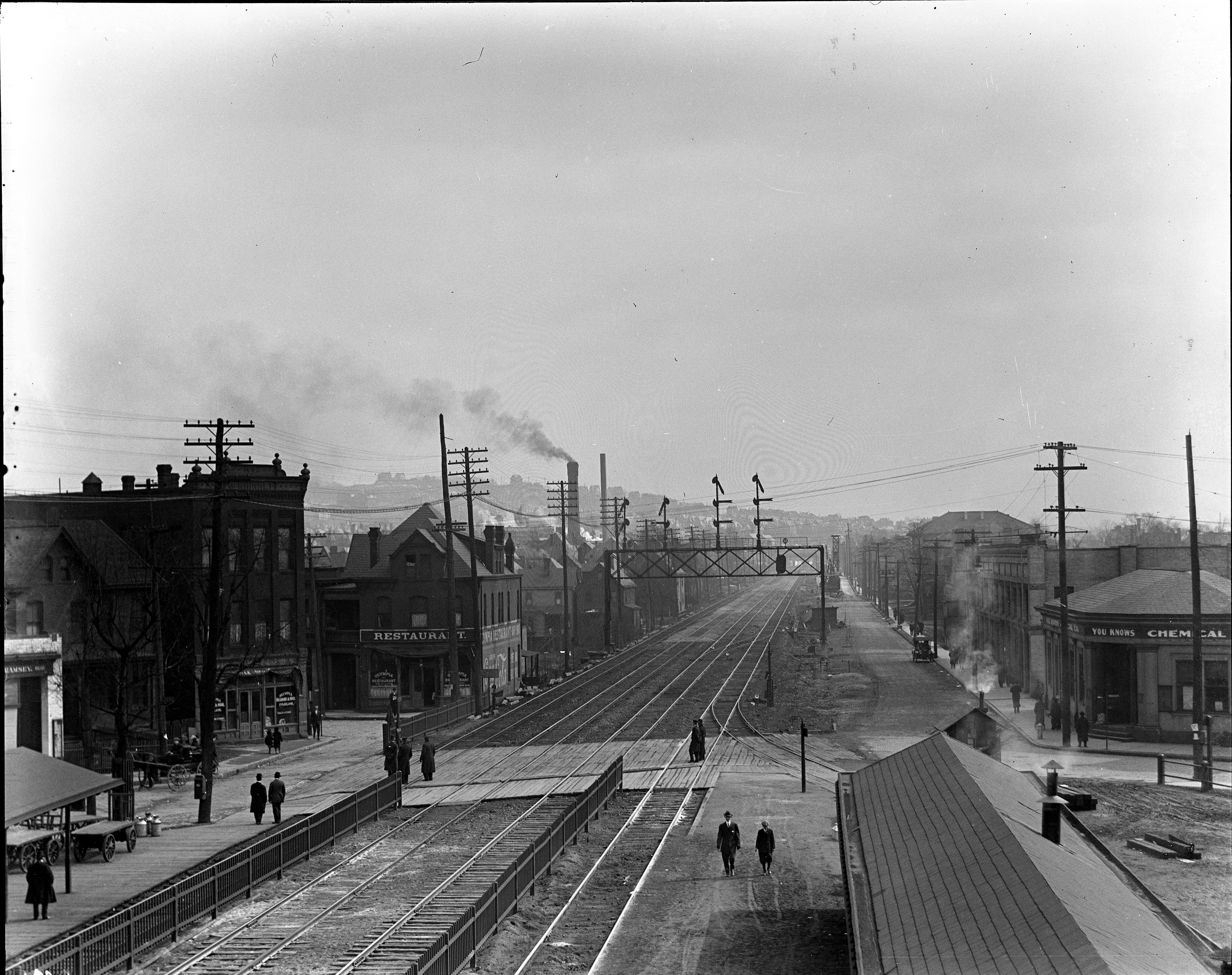
The Pennsylvania Railroad through Wilkinsburg in 1913 before being elevated.

The building was completed in 1916 when the railroad embankment through town was elevated above street level to eliminate hazardous grade crossings. The two previous stations had been located three blocks southeast along Wood Street between Franklin and Rebecca Avenues.

The 1916 station was built of brick and stone in the current Beaux-Arts architecture style with a vitrified tile waiting room and monumental wooden benches. It served three 12-car-length island platforms with enclosed seating areas situated between three pairs of tracks (main and yard leads). Originally the platform surfaces were level with the floors of the railroad passenger cars, but they were later lowered to the level of the track, reportedly due to substandard lateral clearances between the platforms and carbodies caused by the tracks' partially curved alignment when lengthier cars came into use; the change further spared train crews the inconvenience of having to lower and raise trap doors over the coach stairwells for this single station alone when platform levels of the other stations on this commuter route (possibly excepting East Liberty) were not elevated to match. One of the platforms was removed altogether. Access to the platforms was available by stairways at the Penn Avenue, South Avenue, and Franklin Avenue underpasses, in addition to the station tunnel which also served as the Ross Avenue pedestrian underpass. There was also a separate tunnel at the station to deliver mail, express, and baggage to the platforms (a U.S. post office was later constructed across the street from the station, forming a sort of civic center in conjunction with the municipal building/public library, also across the street). The station's strategic location visible down Ross Ave. was negated when that street's motor traffic was made one-way in the opposite direction.

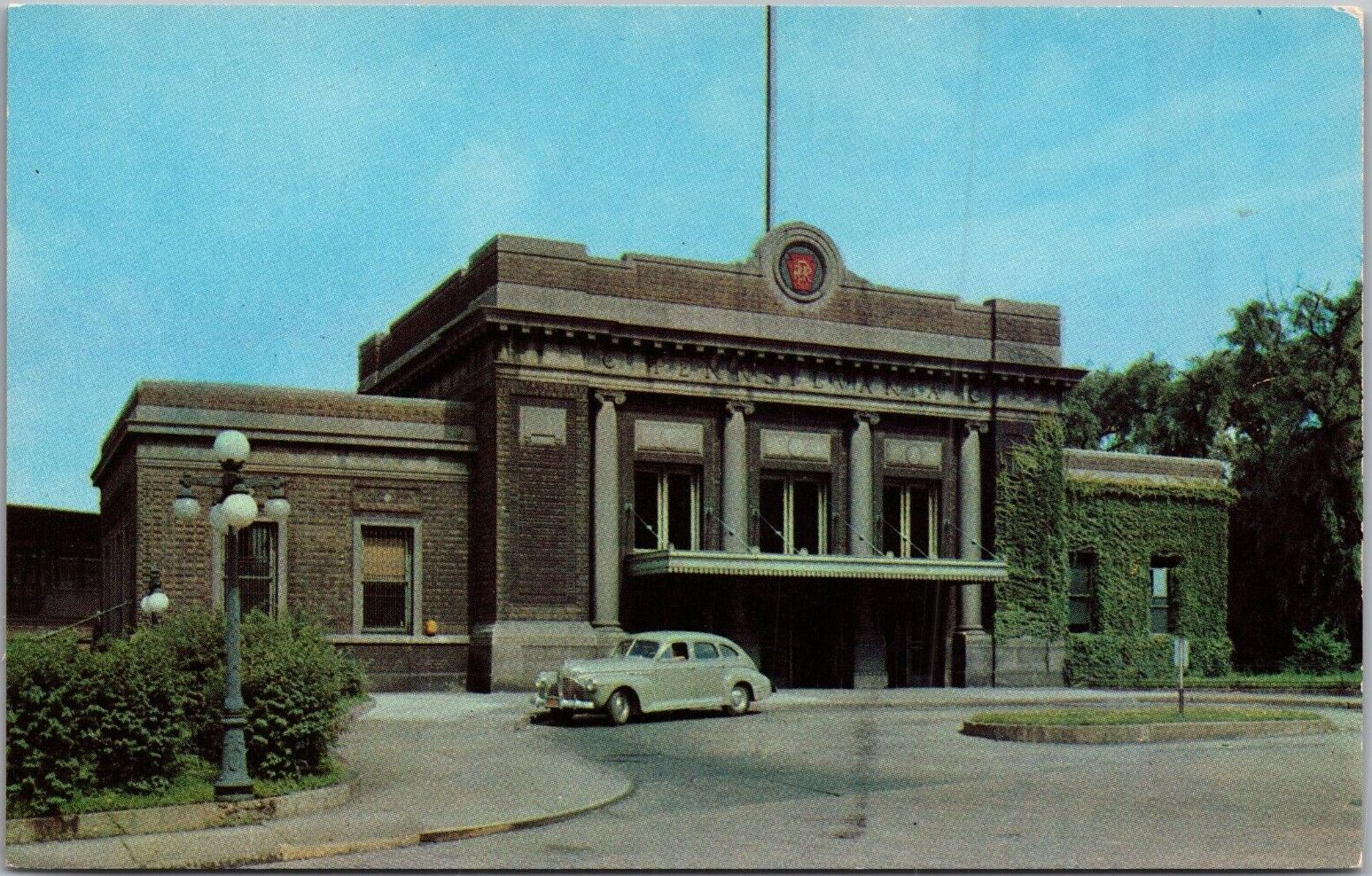
Wilkinsburg station in the 1960s

Some time after demolition of the nearby East Liberty station in 1963, the Wilkinsburg station was designated to assume its function as the satellite station for selected long-distance express trains serving passengers in the East End of Pittsburgh. Meanwhile, Pennsylvania Railroad commuter trains at Wilkinsburg were discontinued on Nov. 27, 1964; some of the long-distance trains continued to provide a limited commuter service even into the Amtrak era. The building was sold to the Borough of Wilkinsburg on Aug. 21, 1967. Although there was no ticket agent in later years, the waiting room remained open to customers and foot traffic during normal business hours until the freight agent was withdrawn, and then was used for the Borough's public-works purposes. The PRR was merged into the Penn Central Transportation Company on Feb. 1, 1968. Its long-distance passenger service was assumed by Amtrak on May 1, 1971, at which time the three most lightly patronized of the four pairs of trains still making daily stops at the station were discontinued. Long-distance passenger-train service at Wilkinsburg ended on September 14, 1975, when Amtrak discontinued the stop, citing a total of 128 passengers boarding or alighting in the first six months of 1975, the lowest system-wide, a far cry from the Borough's and railroad's heyday when the borough's status as a dense bedroom community and commercial draw for the eastern suburbs meant that nearly every local train passing through stopped there, apparently second in importance once again to only East Liberty.

The last train serving Wilkinsburg station was the National Limited, which operated daily between New York City and Kansas City, Missouri. By then, Wilkinsburg had a reputation as an unsafe neighborhood, and the stop was scheduled normally during darkness rather than in daylight. The right of way was conveyed to Consolidated Rail Corporation on April 1, 1976, then to Norfolk Southern Railway on June 1, 1999. During the brief resumption of commuter service with Conrail's Parkway Limited in 1981, the platforms had been removed and the stairways were inaccessible, so these two pairs of trains made their Wilkinsburg stop about two blocks southeast of the station, nearer the location of the predecessor stations; the building was not used. The station was added to the National Register of Historic Places on July 18, 1985.

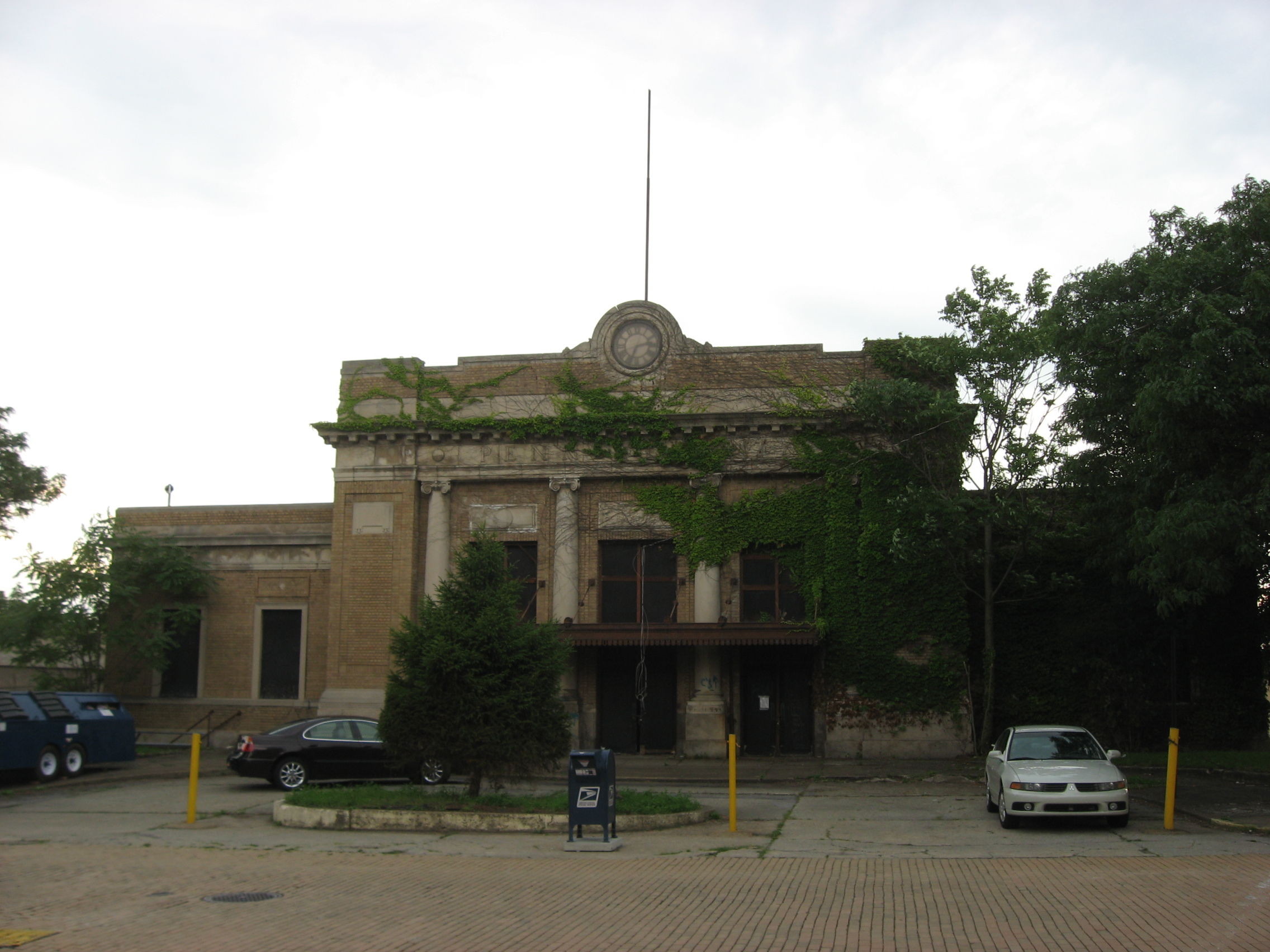
The abandoned station in 2008

After the cession of Amtrak service the station was abandoned and vandalized. Several adaptive re-uses were considered but none advanced beyond the proposal stage. In 2015 the Wilkinsburg Community Development Corporation began a complete renovation of the building as a mixed-use commercial facility. The former baggage area, on the lower level, was transformed into leasable office space. Damaged marble was replaced with stone matched from the original sources in Italy. Paint colors and replacement light fixtures were made to replicate the station's original appearance. The project was completed in September 2021.

== See also ==
- Wilkinsburg station (PAAC)
- National Register of Historic Places listings in Allegheny County, Pennsylvania
