= Roslyn station (Pittsburgh Regional Transit) =

Roslyn
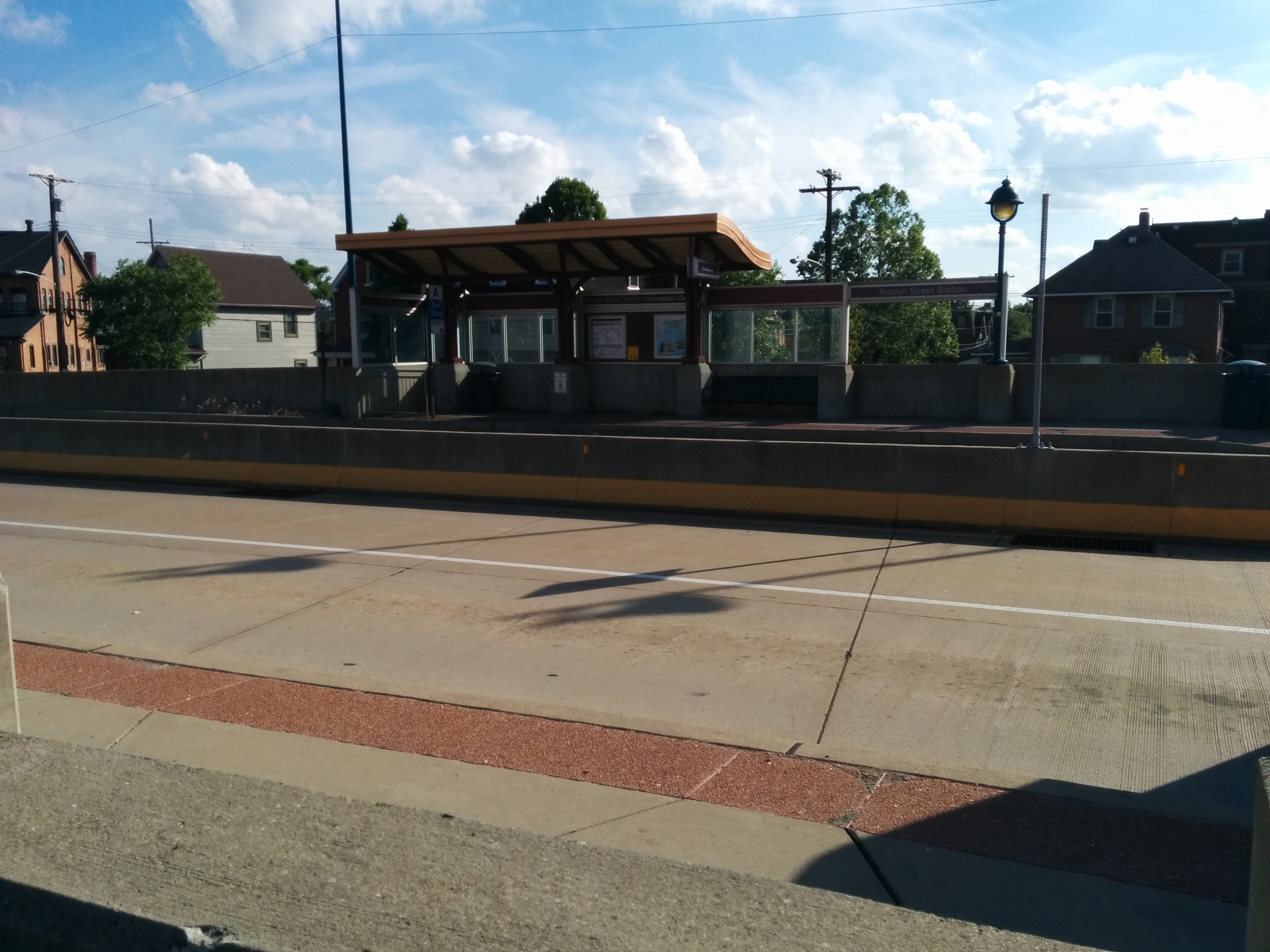

General information
- Coordinates: 40.4193°N 79.8863°W
- Operated by: Pittsburgh Regional Transit
- Line: East Busway

Passengers
- 2018: 601 (weekday boardings)

Services
Preceding station	Pittsburgh Regional Transit	Following station
Hamnett toward Penn Station	East Busway	Swissvale Terminus
Location

Roslyn is a station on the East Busway, located in Swissvale.
