= List of streetcar routes in Pittsburgh =

Pittsburgh Railways operated 68 streetcar routes. The table below lists their dates of operation.

== List ==
No.	Route	opened	closed / renamed	notes
1	Spring Garden	by 1915	Oct 6, 1957	PCC from 1940, closed (low traffic)
2	Etna	by 1907	Sep 2, 1952	Interchange between PRCo and Pittsburgh and Butler Street Railway from 1907 until 1931. PCC from 1938, closed (state took land for PA Route 28)
3	Millvale	by 1915	Sep 2, 1952	PCC from 1938, closed (state took land for PA 28 as with the 2)
4	Troy Hill	by 1915	Jul 7, 1957	Loop was in Troy Hill at Lowrie and Roessler Streets. PCC from 1940, closed (street paving / low traffic)
5	Troy Hill (Lowrie and Gardner)	by 1916	closed; number reassigned	
5	Troy Hill via North Avenue	by 1918	closed; number reassigned	
5	Spring Hill		Oct 6, 1957	PCC from 1946, closed (street paving / low traffic)
6	Brighton Road	by 1915	Jan 26, 1966	In 1915 timetable. PCC from 1938. Became 6/13.
6/13	Brighton Road via Emsworth	Sep 1965	Dec 31, 1965	Cut back to become 6/14 Brighton Avalon when the Avalon bridge (Spruce Run Viaduct) and Ben Avon Bridge (Ravine Street Viaduct), built in 1905, were closed to trolleys due to weight restrictions.
6/14	Brighton Avalon	Dec 1965	Apr 30, 1966	
7	Charles Street	by 1915	Sep 1, 1961	
8	Perrysville Avenue	by 1899	Sep 4, 1965	
9	Charles Street Transfer	by 1916	September 14, 1951	Double-end shuttle (no loop or wye) between the 7 Charles Street and 21 Fineview services.
10	West View and Bellevue	by 1915	Sep 4, 1965	Formed a loop with 15 Bellevue. 10 West View was counterclockwise as far as West View.
11	East Street and Madison Avenue	by 1915	Sep 4, 1965	Short turn of the 10
12	Evergreen Road via East Street	by 1908	February 1954	Interchange between PRCo and Pittsburgh, Harmony, Butler and New Castle Railway from 1908 until 1931. Double-end shuttle (no loop or wye).
13	Emsworth	by 1915	Sep 3, 1966	became 6/13
14	Avalon	by 1915	Apr 30, 1966	Short turn of the 13. Became the 6/14 when 6/13 was cut back to Avalon loop.
15	Bellevue and West View	by 1915	Sep 4, 1965	Formed a loop with 10 West View. 15 Bellevue was clockwise as far as West View.
16	Shadeland			
17	Reedsdale			
18	Woods Run via Union Line	by 1915	Sep 1, 1961	
19	Western Avenue	by 1915	Sep 1, 1961	
20	Rebecca (later renamed Reedsdale)	by 1915	October 14, 1951	PCC from 1942. Closed (loss of Manchester Bridge ramp)
21	Fineview	Mar 31, 1908	Apr 30, 1966	Originally called the "Nunnery Hill" line. Maximum grade of 12.24% was steepest grade on system. Inbound route duplicated 8 Perrysville Avenue. Initially closed without bus replacement due to grades and narrow streets on outbound route. Later duplicated by PAT bus route 11
22	Crosstown	by 1918	Jul 4, 1964	From North Side (formerly Allegheny City) business area to 6th/5th in downtown.
23	Coraopolis – Sewickley	by 1916	Jun 22, 1952	Crossed the Ohio River 3 times, twice to reach and leave Neville Island, then over the entire channel between Coraopolis and Sewickley
24	Schoenville	1919	May 9, 1952	Isolated from main network on January 26, 1920 with the closing of O'Donovan's Bridge due to structural deficiencies. Operated with a single car (4344) that was maintained on the street at one end of the line until closure.
25	McKees Rocks – Island Avenue	by Dec 1, 1910	Jun 21, 1959	
26	McKees Rocks – West Park	by 1915	Jun 21, 1959	
27	Carnegie and Heidelberg	by Dec 1, 1910	Jun 21, 1959	
28	Crafton Junction	by 1916	Jun 21, 1959	
29	Crafton and Thornburg	by 1915	15 November 1952	
30	Crafton and Ingram	by 1915	Jun 21, 1959	
31	Ingram–Sheraden	1897	1950	The Pittsburgh, Crafton and Mansfield (Carnegie) Railway was chartered to build a streetcar line through Sheraden in 1897. The line (combined in 1950 with Route 34 to form the 31/34 Elliott-Ingram) closed when the Point Bridge closed as the replacement did not have tracks.
32	Elliott	by 1915	June 6, 1953	Double-ended shuttle. Later known as 32 P&LE Transfer due to line's eastern terminus at P&LE Station. Track and wire remained intact until 1956 for nonrevenue use.
33	Mount Washington via Point	by 1915	by 1952	Double-ended shuttle
34	Elliott	by 1916	Jun 20, 1959	Became 31/34 Elliott-Ingram in 1950
35	Elliott (Lorenz Avenue only)	by 1916		
35	Castle Shannon – Library Loop			Via Overbrook. Truncation of Charleroi interurban line. Direct ancestor of current Silver Line - Library
36	Fair Haven	by 1916		
36	Castle Shannon – Drake Loop			Via Overbrook. Truncation of Washington interurban line. Direct ancestor of current Blue Line to South Hills Village. Drake Loop service ended September 4, 1999
37	Fair Haven and Castle Shannon	by 1916		Best known by later designation 37 Castle Shannon. Ran via Overbrook; nucleus of modern Blue Line
38	Mount Lebanon and Castle Shannon	1915	May 25, 1963	Outer end beyond W. Liberty Ave. became part of 42/38 Mt. Lebanon-Beechview
38A	Mount Lebanon Castle Shannon Shuttle			A double end shuttle between Castle Shannon and Clearview loop. Replaced by a rush hour extension of 38 Mount Lebanon.
39	Brookline	1905	Sep 3, 1966	South along West Liberty Avenue and then turned east along Brookline Blvd. Originally extended as far as Saw Mill Run, cut back in 1906.
40	Mount Washington via Tunnel	by 1915	Sep 3, 1966	
41	Mount Washington Short Line	by 1915		
42	Dormont	by 1915		became 42/38 Mt. Lebanon-Beechview when 38 trackage on West Liberty Avenue abandoned.
42/38	Mt. Lebanon-Beechview			Formed from 42 Dormont and southern end of 38 Mount Lebanon. Direct ancestor of Red Line
43	Neeld Avenue	by 1916		Short turn of the 42 and 42/38
44	Knoxville via Tunnel	by 1915	circa 1968	Signed as 44 Knoxville-Pa. Sta. for its northern terminus. Combined with route 48 in late 1960s
44/48	Knoxville-Arlington	circa 1968	Nov 14, 1971	
45		by 1916		
46	Brownsville Road	by 1915	Sep 30, 1946	Became 49 Beltzhoover
47	McKinley and Southern	by 1916		
47	Carrick via Tunnel	by 1915	Mar 30, 1968	Rush-hour variant of Route 53; became the new route for the 53 itself in 1968
48	Arlington	by 1915	circa 1968	Combined with 44 Knoxville circa 1968. Portions became part of 49 Arlington-Warrington in 1971
49	Beltzhoover via Brownsville	by 1915	Nov 13, 1971	portions became part of 49 Arlington-Warrington
49	Arlington-Warrington	1971	1984	renamed 52 Allentown
50	Carson via Smithfield	by 1915	Feb 26, 1966	
51	Bon Air	by 1916	by 1959	
52	Carson via Tenth Street Bridge	by 1915	by 1959	
52	Allentown	1984	March 27, 2011	Part of PAT Brown Line. Trackage remains active with no scheduled service.
53	Carrick via South 18th Street	1901	Nov 13, 1971	Terminus in Brentwood. Rerouted via tunnel March 31, 1968. Last car 1627
55	East Pittsburgh via Homestead and Braddock	by 1915	Jul 4, 1964	Replaced by bus when Glenwood Bridge rebuilt without trolley tracks.
55A	Munhall via Homestead		Jul 4, 1964	
56	McKeesport via Dravosburg	1895	Aug 31, 1963	The McKeesport to Dravosburg line was electrified by the McKeesport and Reynoldton Passenger Railway Company in 1892. The line from Pittsburgh was extended from Hays to Dravosburg in 1895 and a trestle linking the two lines was completed in 1897.
56A	Lincoln Place via 2nd Ave.		Aug 31, 1963	
57	Glenwood	Mar 1890	Jul 4, 1964	First permanent electric line in Pittsburgh, Second Avenue Traction Co. Short turn of the 56.
58	Greenfield	by 1915	Jul 4, 1964	
59	Homeville – Homestead		Mar 8, 1953	Double-ended shuttle
60	East Liberty-Homestead		Sep 20, 1958	Some cars extended to serve Kennywood Park, signed East Liberty-Kennywood
62	Trafford	by Dec 1, 1910	May 2, 1962	
63	Trafford City Express	by 1916		
63	Corey Avenue, Braddock	by 1916	by 1953	Double-ended shuttle
64	East Pittsburgh via Wilkinsburg	by 1915	Jan 27, 1967	
65	Hawkins and North Braddock	by 1915		
65	Munhall-Lincoln Place		Sep 4, 1965	
66	East and West Wilkinsburg via Forbes	by 1915	Jan 27, 1967	
67	Swissvale, Rankin and Braddock	by 1915	Jan 28, 1967	Replaced by bus service 61B Braddock – Swissvale Braddock terminus was at Talbot Street (now Avenue) and 13th Street, listed as "Talbot Street loop". This now lies within the boundary of US Steel plant which extended west to 11th street in the 1970s.
68	McKeesport via Homestead and Duquesne	by 1915	Sep 20, 1958	Served Kennywood Park. Longest line on the system (13.8 miles)
69	Larimer via Ellsworth	by 1915		
69	Squirrel Hill		Sep 20, 1958	Short turn of the 68
70	North Highland	by 1915		
71	Centre and Negley	by 1915	Jan 27, 1967	Later called Negley-Highland Park
72	Bloomfield via Forbes	by 1915		
73	North Highland via Forbes	by 1916		
73	Highland		Jan 27, 1967	
75	Wilkinsburg via East Liberty		Jan 27, 1967	
76	Wilkinsburg via Hamilton Avenue	by 1915	Jan 27, 1967	Signed simply as Hamilton. From Fifth and Market, along Fifth to Hamilton, to Brushton, to Tioga, to Wilkinsburg.
77	Wilkinsburg via Fifth Avenue	by 1915		
77/54	North Side to Carrick via Bloomfield		Sep 4, 1965	Fondly known as the "Flying Fraction". Cut back to loop on Seneca and Gist Streets July 8, 1963 due to repaving of Brady Street Bridge
78	Wilkinsburg – Verona	1901	Mar 27, 1938	Originally the Wilkinsburg Verona Street Railway
78	South Highland Avenue via Fifth	by 1915		
78	Laketon Rd.		by 1953	Double end shuttle from Wilkinsburg to Highland Ave. This was a cutback of the line to Verona, Oakmont and Hulton
79	Forbes, Shady and Penn	by 1915		
80	East Pittsburgh via Braddock and Homestead	by 1916		
81	Atwood Street	by 1915	September 8, 1951	Double-ended shuttle route with through downtown single-end cars in rush hours (outer end looped)
82	East Liberty via Centre Avenue	by 1915		
82	Lincoln		Jan 27, 1967	
83	Centre and Herron	by 1915		Short turn of the 82
84	Centre and Larimer (night car)	by 1915		
85	Wylie and Bedford	by 1915	Jan 26, 1966	
86	East Liberty Express	by 1915		
87	Ardmore		Jan 27, 1967	Second longest line on system (by 0.1 mile), at 13.7 miles. Line between Wilmerding and Wilkinsburg abandoned September 4, 1966
88	Frankstown Avenue	by 1915	Jan 27, 1967	
90	Penn Avenue and West Wilkinsburg	by 1915		
92	Shady Loop via Penn	by 1916		
94	Sharpsburg and Aspinwall	by Dec 1, 1910		
94	Aspinwall	1938	Nov 12, 1960	Closed during replacement of 62nd St. Sharpsburg Bridge with Senator Robert D. Fleming Bridge, which did not have streetcar tracks.
95	Butler Street		Nov 12, 1960	Short turn of the 94; turned at 62nd & Butler
96	Penn and Negley via Butler	by 1915		
96	E. Liberty-62nd St.		Nov 12, 1960	
98	Larimer via Penn	by 1916		
98	Glassport		Sep 1, 1963	Closed following severe storm damage on August 3, 1963
99	Evans Ave Glassport			Double end shuttle from Glassport via Ohio Ave, 9th, Monongahela Ave, 5th Ave to Evans Ave. Became 98 Glassport

A notable, unnumbered, tripper (unscheduled extra) service was signed Stadium-Forbes Field, for Pitt Panthers and Pittsburgh Steelers football games and Pirates baseball games. Pitt Stadium and Forbes Field were convenient to the lines on Fifth Avenue and Forbes Avenue, both two-way streets during the trolley era. This service, which probably last ran in fall 1966, was no longer possible after the East End lines closed in January 1967.

== Interurban lines ==
The Interurban lines did not use route numbers. Outbound interurban cars were signed for their outbound destination, namely Charleroi, Roscoe or Washington; some PCC rollsigns instead prefixed Shannon- to the destination, e.g. Shannon-Washington. Inbound cars were signed simply Pittsburgh.

== See also ==
- List of bus routes in Pittsburgh
