= List of bus routes in Pittsburgh =

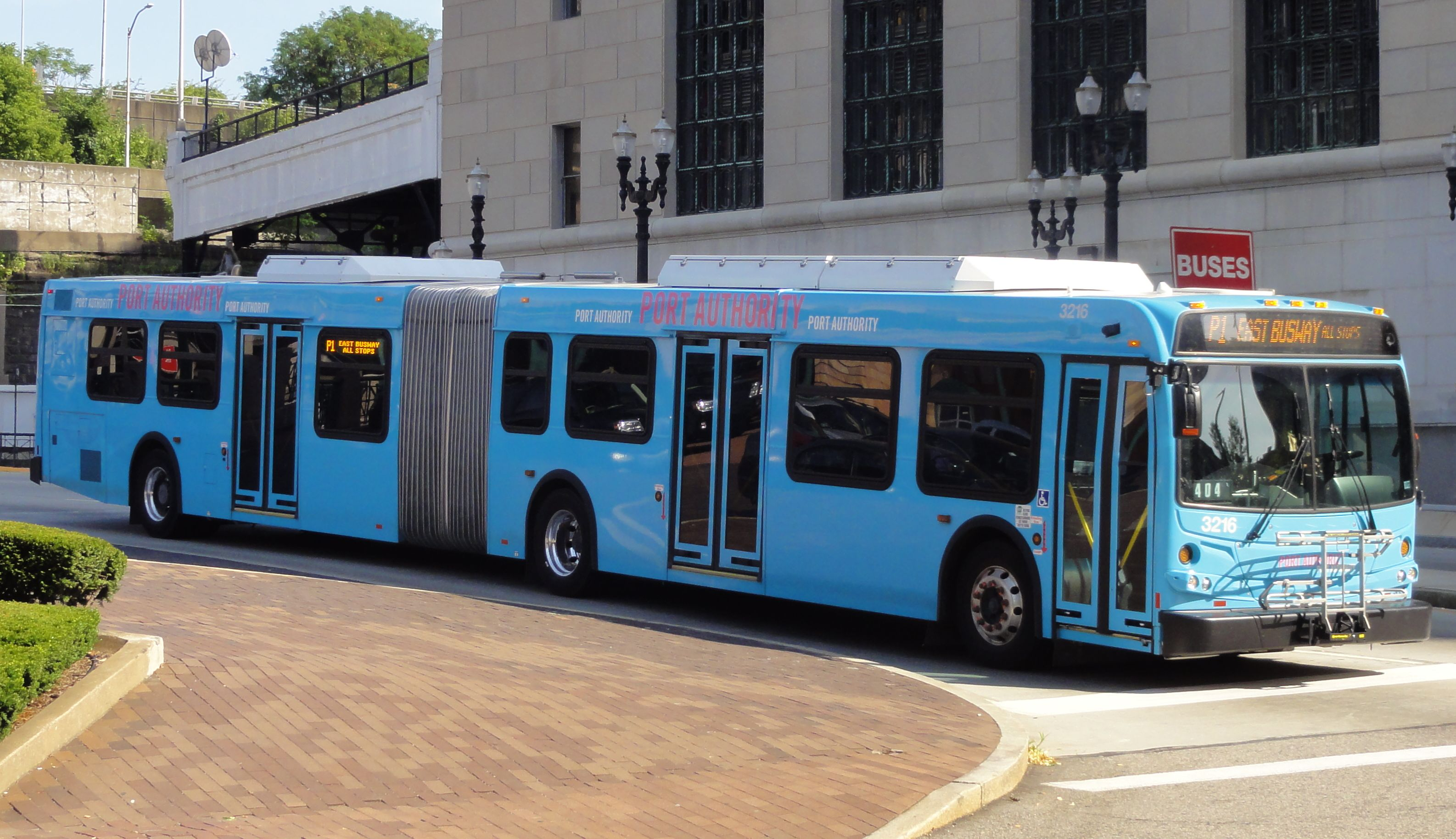
- Pittsburgh Regional Transit bus at Union Station, June 2012
- Parent: Pittsburgh Regional Transit
- Founded: March 1, 1964; 62 years ago
- Service area: Allegheny County and bordering portions of Beaver, Washington, and Westmoreland counties
- Service type: Transit bus, Bus rapid transit
- Routes: 95 (69 local, 26 flyer)
- Fleet: 700+
- Annual ridership: 33,631,100 (2025)
- Fuel type: Diesel, Diesel-electric hybrid, Electric
- Website: rideprt.org

Pittsburgh Regional Transit's bus system serves Allegheny County, with limited service extending into portions of Beaver, Butler, and Westmoreland counties. The system consists of 95 routes, 26 of which are bus rapid transit services (internally called "flyer" routes) that use dedicated busways.

Neighboring counties operate separate transit systems, some of which provide service to Downtown Pittsburgh with connections to Pittsburgh Regional Transit. In 2025, the system recorded 33,631,100 passenger trips.

PRT maintains a fleet of more than 700 buses powered by diesel, diesel-electric hybrid, and battery-electric propulsion.

== Bus routes ==
Service levels

- Daily: Operates seven days a week, including holidays (4 a.m. to 2 a.m.). Most daily routes run every 60 minutes after 7 p.m. Monday–Saturday, and all day on Sundays and holidays.
- Mon–Sat: Operates Monday through Saturday with limited or no holiday service (5 a.m. to 10 p.m. weekdays; 7 a.m. to 7 p.m. Saturdays). Listed in red.
- Weekday: Operates Monday through Friday only (5 a.m. to 7 p.m.).
- Weekday peak: Operates Monday through Friday during peak commute times only (approximately 6–9 a.m. and 3–6 p.m.).

=== Local routes ===
Route	Name	Service level	Service area	Notes	Ref.
1	Freeport Road	Daily	Downtown, North Shore, Allegheny Center, East Allegheny, Washington's Landing, Millvale, Etna, Sharpsburg, Aspinwall, Waterworks Mall, O'Hara, Blawnox, Harmar, Cheswick, Springdale, New Kensington, Creighton, Tarentum		
2	Mount Royal	Weekday	Downtown, Strip District (Weekends Only), North Shore, Allegheny Center, East Allegheny, Washington's Landing, Millvale, Etna, Shaler, McCandless, Ross		
4	Troy Hill	Mon–Sat	Downtown, North Shore, Allegheny Center, East Allegheny, Troy Hill, Reserve, Summer Hill		
6	Spring Hill	Daily	Downtown, North Shore, Allegheny Center, East Allegheny, Spring Hill, City View, Northview Heights, Summer Hill		
7	Spring Garden	Weekday peak	Downtown, North Side, Allegheny Center, East Allegheny, Spring Garden, Reserve, Summer Hill		
8	Perrysville	Daily	Downtown, North Shore, Allegheny Center, Central Northside, Perry South, Observatory Hill, West View		
11	Fineview	Daily	Downtown, North Shore, Allegheny Center, Central Northside, Fineview, Perry South		
12	McKnight	Daily	Downtown, North Shore, Allegheny Center, East Allegheny, East Street Valley, Ross, McCandless		
13	Bellevue	Daily	Downtown, North Shore, Allegheny Center, Mexican War Streets, Calbride Place, Marshall-Shadeland, Brighton Heights, Bellevue, Ross, West View		
14	Ohio Valley	Daily	North Shore, Manchester, Bellevue, Avalon, Ben Avon, Emsworth, Glenfield, Haysville, Osborne, Sewickley, Edgeworth, Leetsdale, Ambridge		
15	Charles	Daily	Downtown, North Shore, Allegheny Center, Mexican War Streets, Charles Street Valley, Perry South, Northview Heights, Summer Hill		
16	Brighton	Daily	Downtown, North Shore, Allegheny Center, Mexican War Streets, Calbride Place, Marshall-Shadeland, Brighton Heights, Bellevue, Avalon		
17	Shadeland	Weekday	Downtown, North Shore, East Allegheny, Mexican War Streets, Manchester, Marshall-Shadeland, Brighton Heights, Ross		
18	Manchester	Daily	North Shore, Allegheny West, Manchester		
19L	Emsworth Limited	Weekday peak	Downtown, Bellevue, Avalon, Ben Avon, Emsworth		
20	Kennedy	Weekday	Downtown, Esplen, McKees Rocks, Kennedy		
21	Coraopolis	Daily	Downtown, Esplen, McKees Rocks, Stowe, Neville Island, Coraopolis, Sewickley, Moon Township		
22	McCoy	Mon–Sat	Downtown, Esplen, McKees Rocks, Stowe, Pleasant Ridge, Kennedy		
24	West Park	Daily	Downtown, Esplen, McKees Rocks, Stowe, Kennedy		
26	Chartiers	Daily	Downtown, West End, Elliott, Sheraden, Allendale Circle, Ingram		
27	Fairywood	Daily	Downtown, West End, Elliott, Crafton Heights, Windgap, Fairywood, Ingram		
29	Robinson	Weekday	East Busway Penn Station, Downtown, West End, Elliott, Crafton Heights, Ingram, Robinson, North Fayette, Pittsburgh Technical Institute		
31	Bridgeville	Daily	East Busway Penn Station, Downtown, West End, Westwood, Oakwood, East Carnegie, Carnegie, Heidelberg, Collier, Bridgeville		
36	Banksville	Weekday	Downtown, Bankville, Dormont, Mt. Lebanon, Bethel Park, South Hills Village		
38	Green Tree	Daily	Downtown, Parkway Center, Green Tree, Scott, Mt. Lebanon, Collier		
39	Brookline	Daily	Downtown, Station Square, Brookline		
40	Mt. Washington	Daily	Downtown, Station Square, Mount Washington, Duquesne Heights		
41	Bower Hill	Daily	Downtown, Station Square, West Liberty Avenue, Dormont, Mt. Lebanon, Scott Township, Bridgeville		
43	Bailey	Daily	Downtown, Station Square, Allentown, Mt. Washington		
44	Knoxville	Daily	Downtown, Station Square, Beltzhoover, Knoxville, Mt. Oliver, St. Clair	Serves Baldwin Borough on weekdays	
48	Arlington	Daily	Downtown, Station Square, South Side, South Side Works, South Side Slopes, Arlington, Allentown, Beltzhoover		
51	Carrick	Daily	Downtown, Station Square, South Side, South Side Slopes, Mount Oliver, Bon Air, Carrick, Brentwood, Whitehall, Baldwin, West Mifflin		
51L	Carrick Limited	Weekday peak	Downtown, Station Square, Mount Oliver, Bon Air, Carrick, Brentwood		
52L	Homeville Limited	Weekday peak	Downtown, South Oakland, Greenfield, Homestead, Munhall, Homeville, West Mifflin, Duquesne		
53	Homestead Park	Mon–Sat	The Waterfront, Homestead, Munhall, Lincoln Place, West Mifflin, Century Square		
53L	Homestead Park Limited	Weekday peak	Downtown, Greenfield, Homestead, Munhall, Lincoln Place, West Mifflin, Century Square		
54	North Side-Oakland-South Side	Daily	Allegheny Station, Allegheny Center, Mexican War Streets, East Allegheny, Strip District, Polish Hill, Lawrenceville, Bloomfield, North Oakland, Oakland, South Side, Mount Oliver, Knoxville, Beltzhoover, Allentown, South Hills Junction, Bon Air	One route with two branches: C branch operates via Penn Avenue and Main Street in Lawrenceville and to South Hills Junction; D branch operates via Polish Hill and to Bon Air	
55	Glassport	Daily	Century Square, West Mifflin Wal-Mart, Southland Shopping Center, CCAC South, Jefferson Regional Medical Center, Clairton, Glassport, McKeesport, UPMC McKeesport, Port Perry, Great Valley Shopping Center, North Versailles Wal-Mart		
56	Lincoln Place	Daily	Downtown, Technology Center, The Run, Hazelwood, Glenwood, Hays, Lincoln Place, West Mifflin, Dravosburg, McKeesport, Penn State		
57	Hazelwood	Daily	Downtown, Technology Center, The Run, Hazelwood, Glenwood, Glen Hazel, The Waterfront		
58	Greenfield	Daily	Downtown, Technology Center, The Run, Greenfield, South Oakland, Oakland		
59	Mon Valley	Daily	North Versailles, Turtle Creek, East Pittsburgh, Forest Hills, Braddock Hills, North Braddock, Braddock, Swissvale, Rankin, Munhall, The Waterfront, Homestead, Whitaker, Duquesne, McKeesport, Dravosburg, West Mifflin		
60	Walnut-Crawford Village	Weekday	Crawford Village, McKeesport, Versailles		
61A	North Braddock	Daily	Downtown, Uptown, Soho, Oakland, Squirrel Hill, Wilkinsburg, Edgewood, Swissvale, North Braddock, Braddock	To use PRTX University Line after 2027	
61B	Braddock-Swissvale	Daily	Downtown, Uptown, Soho, Oakland, Squirrel Hill, Regent Square, Swissvale, Rankin, Braddock	To use PRTX University Line after 2027	
61C	McKeesport-Homestead	Daily	Downtown, Uptown, Soho, Oakland, Squirrel Hill, Greenfield, Homestead, Munhall, West Mifflin, Kennywood Park, Duquesne, McKeesport	To use PRTX University Line after 2027	
61D	Murray Short	Daily	Oakland, Squirrel Hill, Greenfield, The Waterfront	To use part of PRTX University Line in Oakland after 2027. Some PM peak short-turn service between Oakland and Greenfield.	
64	Lawrenceville-Waterfront	Daily	Lawrenceville, Bloomfield, Shadyside, Squirrel Hill, Greenfield, The Waterfront		
65	Squirrel Hill	Weekday peak	Downtown, South Oakland, Squirrel Hill		
67	Monroeville	Daily	Downtown, Uptown, Soho, Oakland, Squirrel Hill, Point Breeze, Wilkinsburg, Churchill, Wilkins, Monroeville, CCAC Boyce	Only serves Monroeville Mall, Penn Center East, Churchill, Beacon Hill, Wilkinsburg, Point Breeze, Squirrel Hill, Oakland, Uptown and Downtown on Weekends and Holidays	
69	Trafford	Daily	Downtown, Uptown, Soho, Oakland, Squirrel Hill, Point Breeze, Wilkinsburg, Forest Hills, Wilkinsburg, Forest Hills, Chalfant, East Pittsburgh, Turtle Creek, Wilmerding, Pitcairn, Trafford	Runs weekdays between downtown Pittsburgh and Trafford and weekends/holidays between Wilkinsburg and Trafford	
71	Edgewood Towne Center	Weekday	Wilkinsburg, Regent Square, Swissvale, Swisshelm Park, Rankin, Hawkins Village		
71A	Negley Short	Daily	Oakland, North Oakland, Shadyside, Friendship, East Liberty, Highland Park	To use part of PRTX University Line in Oakland after 2027	
71B	Highland Park	Daily	Downtown, Uptown, Soho, Oakland, Shadyside, East Liberty, Highland Park	To use PRTX University Line after 2027	
71C	Point Breeze Short	Daily	Oakland, North Oakland, Shadyside, Friendship, East Liberty, Bakery Square, Point Breeze, Wilkinsburg	To use part of PRTX University Line in Oakland after 2027	
71D	Hamilton Short	Daily	Oakland, Shadyside, Point Breeze, Homewood, Brushton, Wilkinsburg	To use part of PRTX University Line in Oakland after 2027	
74	Homewood-Squirrel Hill	Mon–Sat	East Liberty, Larimer, Lincoln-Lemington, Belmar Gardens, Homewood, Point Breeze, Squirrel Hill		
75	Ellsworth	Daily	South Side Works, Oakland, Shadyside, East Liberty, Bakery Square, Larimer, Highland Park, Morningside, Aspinwall, Waterworks Mall, O'Hara		
77	Penn Hills	Daily	Downtown, Polish Hill, Baum Boulevard, East Liberty, Larimer, Homewood, Brushton, Eastwood, Penn Hills, North Bessemer, Universal, Plum, CCAC Boyce	One route with two weekday branches: L branch operates via Leechburg Road; S branch operates via Saltsburg Road; All service operates between Downtown and Alcoma Apartments on weekends.	
79	East Hills	Daily	Wilkinsburg, East Hills		
81	Oak Hill	Daily	Downtown, Crawford Square, Hill District, Skyline Terrace, Oak Hill, Oakland, South Side		
82	Lincoln	Daily	Downtown, Crawford Square, Hill District, North Oakland, Shadyside, East Liberty, Larimer, Lincoln-Lemington		
83	Bedford Hill	Daily	Downtown, Crawford Square, Hill District, Bedford Hill, Sugartop, VA Hospital, Oakland, South Side		
86	Liberty	Daily	Downtown, Strip District, Bloomfield, Shadyside, East Liberty, Larimer, Homewood, Brushton, Wilkinsburg		
87	Friendship	Daily	Downtown, Strip District, Bloomfield, Friendship, East Liberty, Highland Park, Morningside, Stanton Heights, Lawrenceville	This route has two branches: to Morningside (weekdays only) and to Stanton Heights (7 days a week)	
88	Penn	Daily	Downtown, Strip District, Lawrenceville, Bloomfield, Garfield, Friendship, East Liberty, Bakery Square, North Point Breeze		
89	Garfield Commons	Daily	North Point Breeze, Bakery Square, East Liberty, Larimer, Garfield Commons, Garfield		
91	Butler Street	Daily	Downtown, Strip District, Lawrenceville, Sharpsburg, Aspinwall, Waterworks Mall, O'Hara, VA Hospital		
93	Lawrenceville–Oakland–Hazelwood	Daily	Lawrenceville, Children's Hospital, Bloomfield, North Oakland, Oakland, South Oakland, Schenley Park, Greenfield, Hazelwood, Glen Hazel		

=== Flyer routes ===
Numbering

Busways are designated by the following colors:

- G# Bus routes using the West Busway, are designated with the color green and a 'G' prefix
- O# Bus routes using the I-279 HOV lanes, are designated with the color orange and a 'O' prefix
- P# Bus routes using the Martin Luther King Jr. East Busway, are designated with the color purple and a 'P' prefix
- Y# Bus routes using the South Busway, are designated with the color yellow and a 'Y' prefix

Route	Name	Service level	Service area	Notes	Ref.
28X	Airport Flyer	Daily	Point Breeze, Shadyside, Oakland, Downtown, Robinson Town Centre, Pittsburgh International Airport via West Busway	Stop restrictions on West Busway.	
G2	West Busway–All Stops	Daily	Downtown, Sheraden, Ingram, Crafton, Carnegie via West Busway		
G3	Moon Flyer	Weekday peak	Downtown, Moon via West Busway	Stop restrictions on West Busway.	
G31	Bridgeville Flyer	Weekday peak	Downtown, Carnegie, Heidelberg, Collier, Bridgeville via West Busway	Stop restrictions on West Busway.	
O1	Ross Flyer	Weekday peak	Downtown, Ross Park & Ride via I-279 HOV Lane		
O5	Thompson Run Flyer	Weekday peak	Downtown, Ross, McCandless via I-279 HOV Lane		
O12	McKnight Flyer	Weekday peak	Downtown, Ross, McCandless via I-279 HOV Lane		
P1	East Busway–All Stops	Daily	Downtown, Polish Hill, Shadyside, East Liberty, Homewood, Wilkinsburg, Swissvale via East Busway		
P3	East Busway–Oakland	Weekday	Oakland, North Oakland, Shadyside, East Liberty, Homewood, Wilkinsburg, Swissvale via East Busway	To use PRTX University Line after 2027	
P7	McKeesport Flyer	Weekday peak	Downtown, Edgewood, Swissvale, Rankin, West Mifflin, Duquesne, McKeesport via East Busway	Stop restrictions on East Busway.	
P10	Allegheny Valley Flyer	Weekday peak	Downtown, RIDC Park East, Springdale, Creighton, Tarentum, Brackenridge, Harrison via East Busway	Stop restrictions on East Busway.	
P12	Holiday Park Flyer	Weekday peak	Downtown, Monroeville, Plum via East Busway	Stop restrictions on East Busway.	
P13	Mount Royal Flyer	Weekday peak	Downtown, Etna, Shaler, McCandless	The only "P" branded route that does not use the East Busway	
P16	Penn Hills Flyer	Weekday peak	Downtown, Wilkinsburg, Blackridge, Churchill Valley, Penn Hills, North Bessemer, Universal, Plum via East Busway	Stop restrictions on East Busway. Two branches—Universal Branch via East Vue and Universal Road; Leechburg Branch via Leechburg	
P17	Lincoln Park Flyer	Weekday peak	Downtown, Larimer, Lincoln-Lemington, Lincoln Park, Eastwood via East Busway	Stop restrictions on East Busway.	
P67	Monroeville Flyer	Weekday peak	Downtown, Wilkins, Monroeville Mall Park & Ride via East Busway	Stop restrictions on East Busway.	
P68	Braddock Hills Flyer	Daily	Downtown, Wilkinsburg, Braddock Hills, North Braddock, East Pittsburgh, Turtle Creek, Monroeville via East Busway	Stop restrictions on East Busway.	
P69	Trafford Flyer	Weekday peak	Downtown, Wilkinsburg, Braddock Hills, North Braddock, East Pittsburgh, Turtle Creek, Monroeville via East Busway	Stop restrictions on East Busway.	
P71	Swissvale Flyer	Weekday peak	Downtown, Wilkinsburg, Regent Square, Swisshelm Park, Swissvale via East Busway	Stop restrictions on East Busway.	
P76	Lincoln Highway Flyer	Weekday peak	Downtown, Wilkinsburg, Forest Hills, Chalfant, East Pittsburgh, North Versailles, East McKeesport, White Oak, Versailles via East Busway	Stop restrictions on East Busway.	
P78	Oakmont Flyer	Weekday	Downtown, Wilkinsburg, Blackridge, Penn Hills, Rosedale, Verona, Oakmont, Harmar via East Busway	Stop restrictions on East Busway.	
Y1	Large Flyer	Weekday peak	Downtown, Brentwood, Whitehall, Baldwin, Pleasant Hills, Jefferson via South Busway	Follows same routing as Y46, but has stop restrictions and makes fewer stops on Route 51.	
Y45	Baldwin Manor Flyer	Weekday peak	Downtown, Brookline, Overbrook, Whitehall, Baldwin, South Park Township via South Busway		
Y46	Elizabeth Flyer	Daily	Downtown, Brookline, Overbrook, Brentwood, Whitehall, Baldwin, Pleasant Hills, Jefferson, Clairton, Elizabeth via South Busway	Select weekday trips serve Large Park and Ride	
Y47	Curry Flyer	Mon–Sat	Downtown, Brookline, Overbrook, Whitehall, Pleasant Hills, West Mifflin via South Busway	Weekday trips extend to CCAC South	
Y49	Prospect Park Flyer	Daily	Downtown, Brookline, Overbrook, Brentwood, Whitehall, Baldwin, West Mifflin via South Busway		

== See also ==
- List of streetcar routes in Pittsburgh
