= Martin Luther King Jr. East Busway =

Bus rapid transit line in Pittsburgh

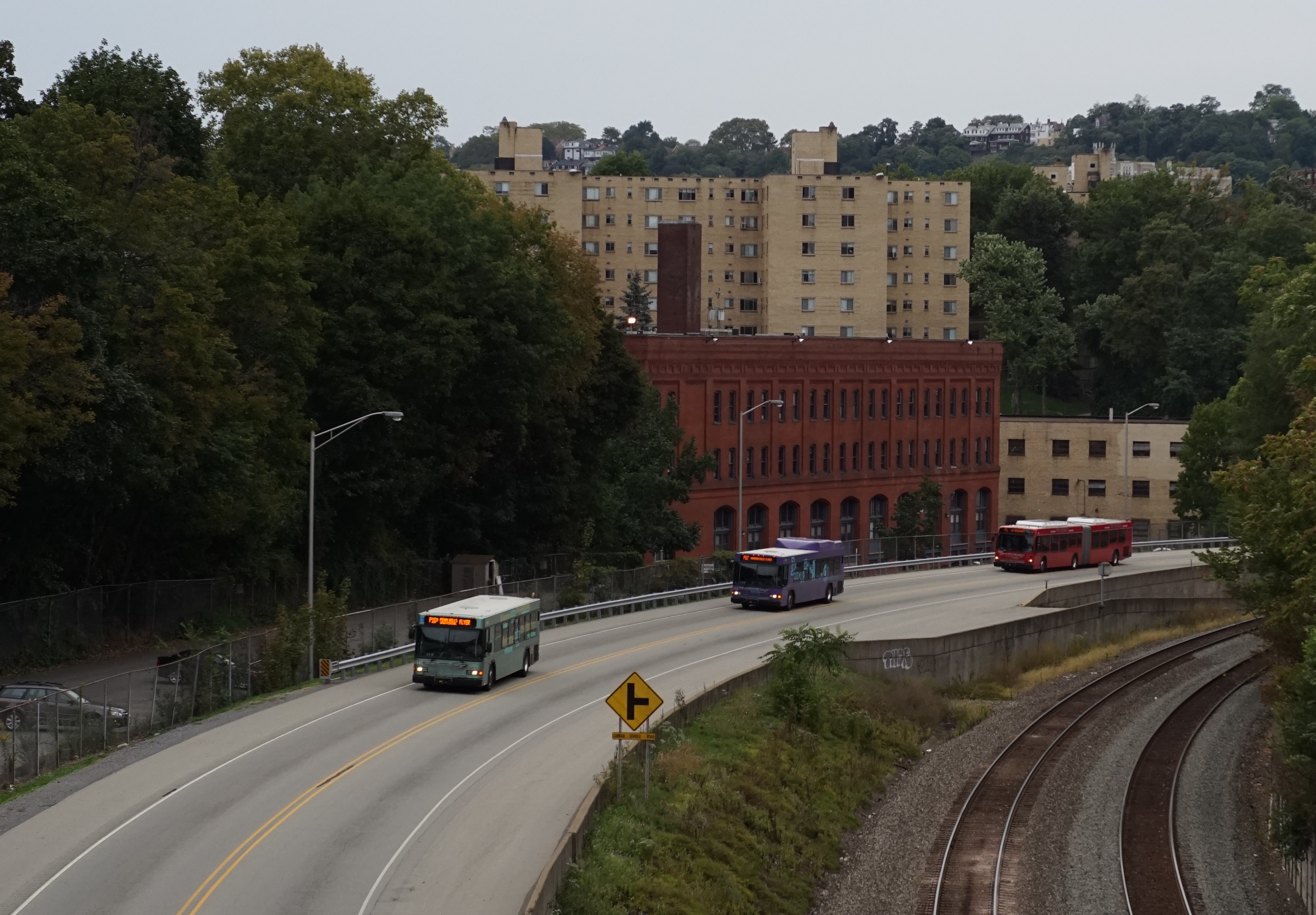
- Three buses on the busway near UPMC Shadyside

Overview
- Locale: Pittsburgh
- Termini: Penn Station; Swissvale
- Stations: 10

Service
- Type: Bus rapid transit
- System: Pittsburgh Regional Transit

History
- Opened: February 1983

Technical
- Line length: 9.1 mi (14.6 km)
- Operating speed: 55 mph (89 km/h) (top)
Route map
Martin Luther King Jr. East Busway highlighted in purple
Detailed diagram

The Martin Luther King Jr. East Busway is a two-lane bus rapid transit corridor serving the city of Pittsburgh and its eastern neighborhoods and suburbs. Owned and maintained by Pittsburgh Regional Transit, the busway is named after Martin Luther King Jr. and provides service to communities including Wilkinsburg and East Liberty.

The corridor has received a Bronze rating under the BRT Standard developed by the Institute for Transportation and Development Policy. Like other busways in Pittsburgh, it operates on a dedicated right-of-way designed to improve travel times and reduce roadway congestion.

== History ==
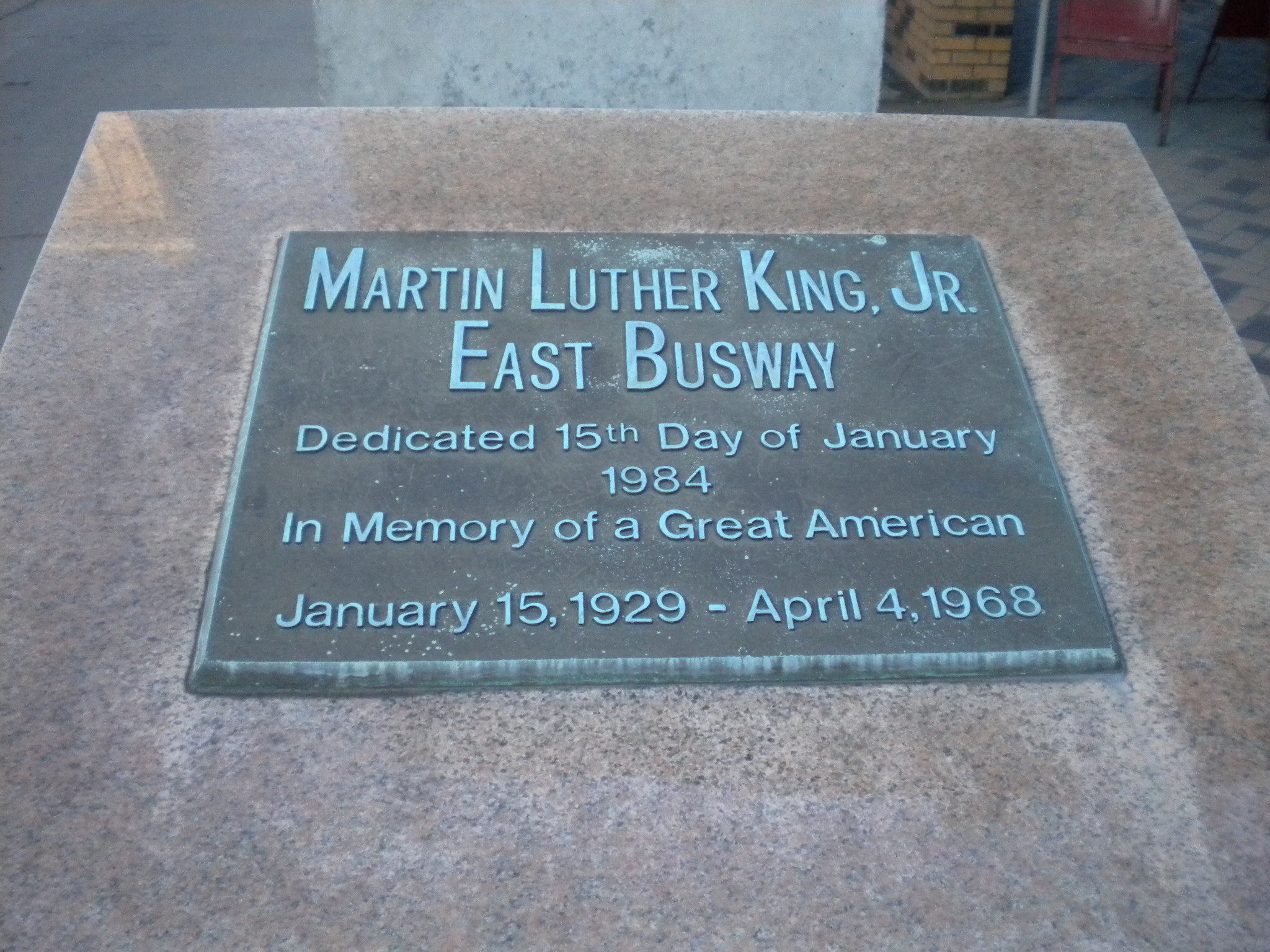
Plaque at Penn Station dedicating the Busway

The busway was developed along a former railroad right-of-way acquired by the Port Authority of Allegheny County from the Pittsburgh Railways Company in 1964. It came as part of broader efforts to modernize the region’s transit system and address increasing traffic congestion following the decline of streetcar service. The corridor was identified as a suitable transit route due to its direct alignment between Downtown Pittsburgh and the eastern suburbs.

The initial segment opened in March 1983, running 6.8 miles (10.9 km) between Penn Station in Downtown Pittsburgh and Wilkinsburg station. By using a separated right-of-way, the busway significantly reduced travel times compared to conventional bus routes, particularly during peak periods.

In 2003, the line was extended by 2.3 miles (3.7 km) to Swissvale, bringing its total length to 9.1 miles (14.6 km). Edgewood initially opposed the expansion, over concerns about bus noise, air quality, and car and pedestrian traffic around stations. Edgewood has stated that it would prefer the busway be converted to a light rail line.

In July 2013, a further extension of the East Busway to an expanded Mon–Fayette Expressway was proposed. As of 2018, that proposal was still part of Southwestern Pennsylvania Commission's plans.

== Routes ==
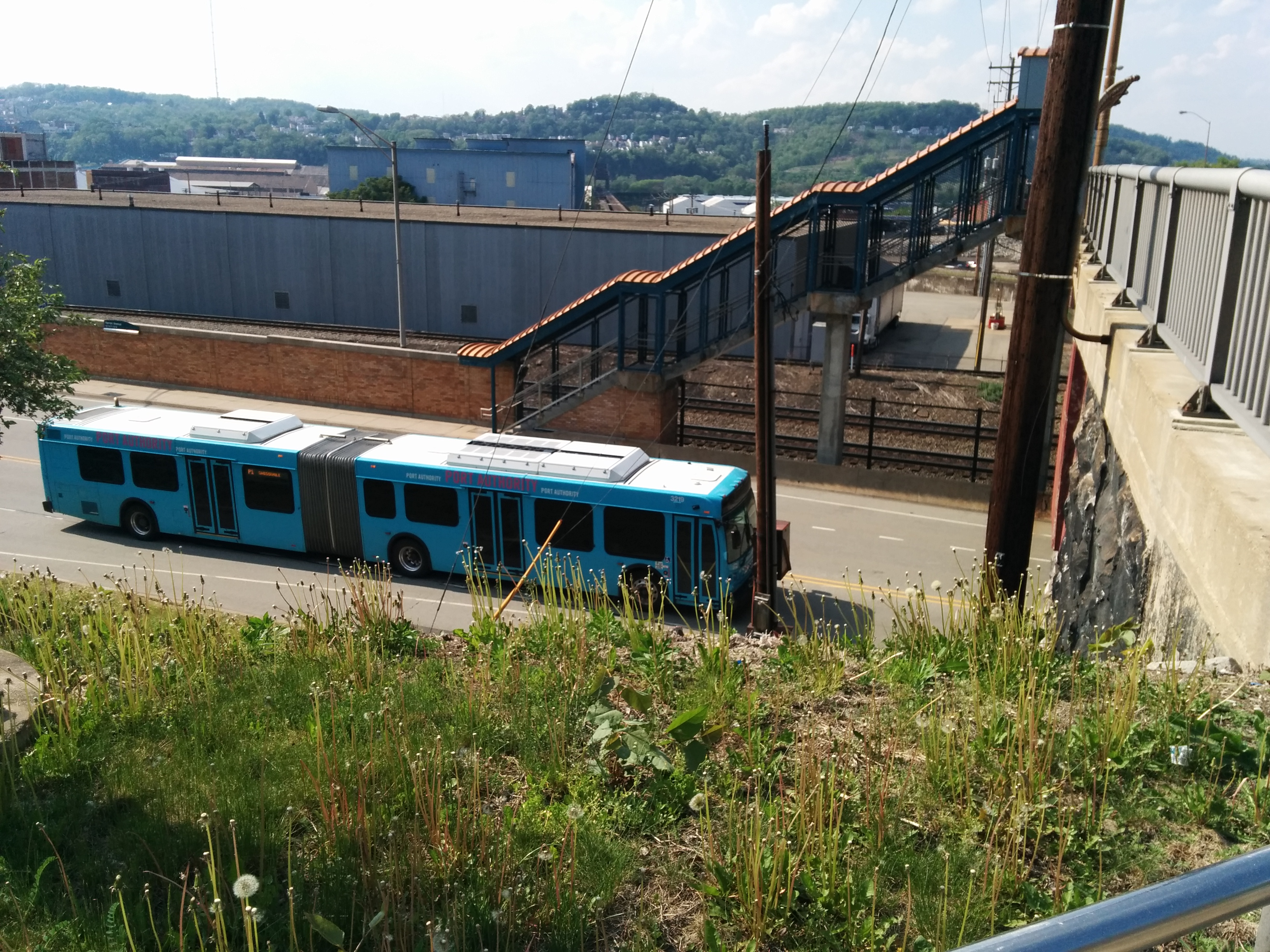
Bus at Herron station

Following the naming convention of each busway being designated by a color, bus routes that use the East Busway begin with a "P" for purple. However, the P13 (Mount Royal Flyer) is colored purple and uses a "P" designation, but does not use the busway; instead, it travels via Route 28. The P1 ("East Busway–All Stops") is the main route, operating seven days a week and running the full length of the Busway between Swissvale and Downtown Pittsburgh, making all stops, before running a short loop through the central business district. It is the busiest Pittsburgh Regional Transit bus route by ridership.

All busway routes travel to downtown Pittsburgh, making a loop around before returning via the busway. The one exception to this is the P3 (East Busway-Oakland), which starts in Swissvale, but leaves the busway via the Neville Street Ramp, serving the business district of Oakland and terminating at Robinson Street.

Many of Pittsburgh Regional Transit's express and suburban Flyer routes also use the busway, but with stop restrictions, not picking up passengers at some busway stations in the inbound direction or dropping off passengers at some busway stations in the outbound direction. These routes operate primarily during weekday rush hours allowing buses to bypass the heavily congested Parkway East (Interstate 376), making for faster trip times. The East Busway is also used by some Westmoreland Transit routes, which run further into the Pittsburgh suburbs, ending in the cities of Greensburg and Latrobe in Westmoreland County.

As of February 2024, the Pittsburgh Regional Transit bus routes that use the East Busway are as follows:

Route	Route Name	Destination	Service	Notes
P1	East Busway–All Stops	Swissvale station	Daily, all-day service	East Busway
P3	East Busway–Oakland	5th Av & Robinson St	Weekdays only	Neville St/5th Av
P7	McKeesport Flyer	McKeesport Transportation Center	Weekday peak hours only, stop restrictions	Edgewood Av/Rankin Bl/Kennywood Bl
P10	Allegheny Valley Flyer	Harrison	Weekday peak hours only, stop restrictions	Route 28/Freeport Rd
P12	Holiday Park Flyer	Holiday Park	Weekday peak hours only, stop restrictions	Penn Av/Parkway East/Golden Mile Hwy
P16	Penn Hills Flyer	Alpha Ice Complex, Harmar	Weekday peak hours only, stop restrictions	Leechburg Rd or Universal Rd
P17	Lincoln Park Flyer	Nadine	Weekday peak hours only, stop restrictions	Lincoln Av/Mt Carmel Rd
P67	Monroeville Flyer	Monroeville Mall	Weekday peak hours only, stop restrictions	William Penn Hwy
P68	Braddock Hills Flyer	Forbes Hospital	Daily, all-day service, stop restrictions	Brinton Rd/Braddock Av/James St
P69	Trafford Flyer	Viaduct Way, Trafford	Weekday peak hours only, stop restrictions	Ardmore Bl/Airbrake Av/Broadway Bl
P71	Swissvale Flyer	Swissvale station	Weekday peak hours only, stop restrictions	Savannah Av/Braddock Av/Woodstock Av
P76	Lincoln Highway Flyer	Olympia Park and Ride	Weekday peak hours only, stop restrictions	Ardmore Bl/Lincoln Hwy/Long Run Rd
P78	Oakmont Flyer	Alpha Ice Complex, Harmar	Weekdays only, stop restrictions	Laketon Rd/Verona Rd/Allegheny River Bl

== Stations ==
Station Name	Neighborhood/Borough	Routes	Notes
Penn Station	Downtown	P1 P7 P10 P12 P16 P17 P67 P68 P69 P71 P76 P78	Amtrak: Floridian, Pennsylvanian at Union Station; Greyhound Lines at Grant Street Transportation Center PRT: G3 G31 (connects to West Busway); PRT: O1 , O5 , O12 (connects to I-279 HOV)
Herron	Polish Hill	P1 P7 P10 P12 P16 P17 P67 P68 P69 P71 P76 P78	
Negley	Shadyside	P1 P3 P7 P10 P12 P16 P17 P67 P68 P69 P71 P76 P78	
East Liberty	East Liberty	P1 P3 P7 P10 P12 P16 P17 P67 P68 P69 P71 P76 P78	
Homewood	Homewood, Point Breeze North	P1 P3 P7 P12 P16 P67 P68 P69 P71 P76 P78	
Wilkinsburg	Wilkinsburg	P1 P3 P7 P12 P16 P67 P68 P69 P71 P76 P78	Park and ride: 748 spaces
Hay Street	Wilkinsburg	P7 P12 P16 P67 P68 P69 P71 P76 P78	Located on spur to Hay Street
Hamnett	Wilkinsburg	P1 P3	Park and ride: 128 spaces
Roslyn	Swissvale	P1 P3	
Swissvale	Swissvale	P1 P3	Park and ride: 163 spaces

== See also ==
- West Busway
- South Busway
- Pittsburgh Light Rail
