= Parkway Limited =

Commuter rail In Pittsburgh, Pennsylvania

Overview
- Service type: Commuter rail
- Status: Discontinued
- Locale: Pennsylvania
- First service: March 3, 1981
- Last service: November 13, 1981
- Former operator(s): Conrail (under contract to PennDOT)

Route
- Termini: Pittsburgh; Greensburg
- Stops: 5
- Service frequency: Two daily round-trips on weekdays

Technical
- Track gauge: 4 ft 8 1/2 in (1,435 mm)
- Track owner(s): Conrail

The Parkway Limited was a short-lived commuter train operated by Conrail (under contract to PennDOT) between Pittsburgh, Pennsylvania, and Greensburg, Pennsylvania, in 1981. The train was created in response to construction work on the section of Interstate 376 known as Parkway East. The train was funded by $2 million of a $10 million grant from the Federal Highway Administration. It supplemented the PATrain service, which ran slightly to the south.

The service had two departures daily in each direction: early morning inbound runs from Greensburg and Pitcairn, with corresponding outbound returns in the late afternoon. The trains used Penn Station in downtown Pittsburgh, becoming the first commuter rail service there since 1964.

== Equipment ==
To operate the service, PennDOT acquired ten refurbished coaches from Amtrak, the national passenger railroad operator. Amtrak itself had acquired the ten coaches in 1971 when it took over most private-sector long-haul passenger services. The ten coaches had been built by Budd and Pullman-Standard between 1940 and 1954. Amtrak declared the cars surplus after it switched from steam heating to head end power.

== History ==
Commuter service once operated on the line between Pittsburgh and Derry, discontinued in 1964

The service began running on March 3, 1981. Initial patronage was good, with the first trains standing-room only, but by summer ridership had dwindled. The second inbound trip from Pitcairn, which carried at times as few as five passengers, was dropped. To compensate, Amtrak began stopping the Fort Pitt (Pittsburgh–Altoona) at Pitcairn. (The Fort Pitt already stopped at Greensburg.) Service at Manor was discontinued in favor of Irwin, 2.4 miles (3.9 km) closer to Pittsburgh. In addition, a move to mainline trackage in Westmoreland County shaved 12 minutes off the schedule.

PennDOT canceled the train in November, citing insufficient ridership. From a high of 600 at the train's launch, daily ridership had dropped below 200. The East Busway opened in 1983 over part of the Parkway Limited's route.
