= Hay Street station =

Hay Street

General information
- Coordinates: 40.4443°N 79.8873°W
- Operated by: Pittsburgh Regional Transit
- Line: East Busway Hay Street Ramp

Passengers
- 2018: 323 (weekday boardings)

Services
Preceding station	Pittsburgh Regional Transit	Following station
Wilkinsburg toward Penn Station	East Busway Hay Street Ramp	Terminus
Location

Hay Street is a set of bus stops on ramps connecting the East Busway to Hay Street in Wilkinsburg.
