= Swissvale station =

Swissvale

General information
- Coordinates: 40.4152°N 79.8788°W
- Operator: Pittsburgh Regional Transit
- Line: East Busway

Construction
- Parking: 163 spaces

Passengers
- 2018: 1,015 (weekday boardings)

Services
Preceding station	Pittsburgh Regional Transit	Following station
Roslyn toward Penn Station	East Busway	Terminus

Former services
Preceding station	Pennsylvania Railroad	Following station
Wilkinsburg toward Pittsburgh	Pitcairn Local	Hawkins toward North Trafford
Edgewood toward Pittsburgh	Pitcairn Local	Hawkins toward North Trafford
Preceding station	PennDOT	Following station
Wilkinsburg toward Pittsburgh	Parkway Limited	Pitcairn toward Greensburg
Location

Swissvale is a station on the East Busway, located in Swissvale near Rankin.

There is a park and ride lot adjacent to the station.
