= Union Station (Pittsburgh) =

Railway station in Pittsburgh, Pennsylvania, U.S.

Union Station Pittsburgh, PA
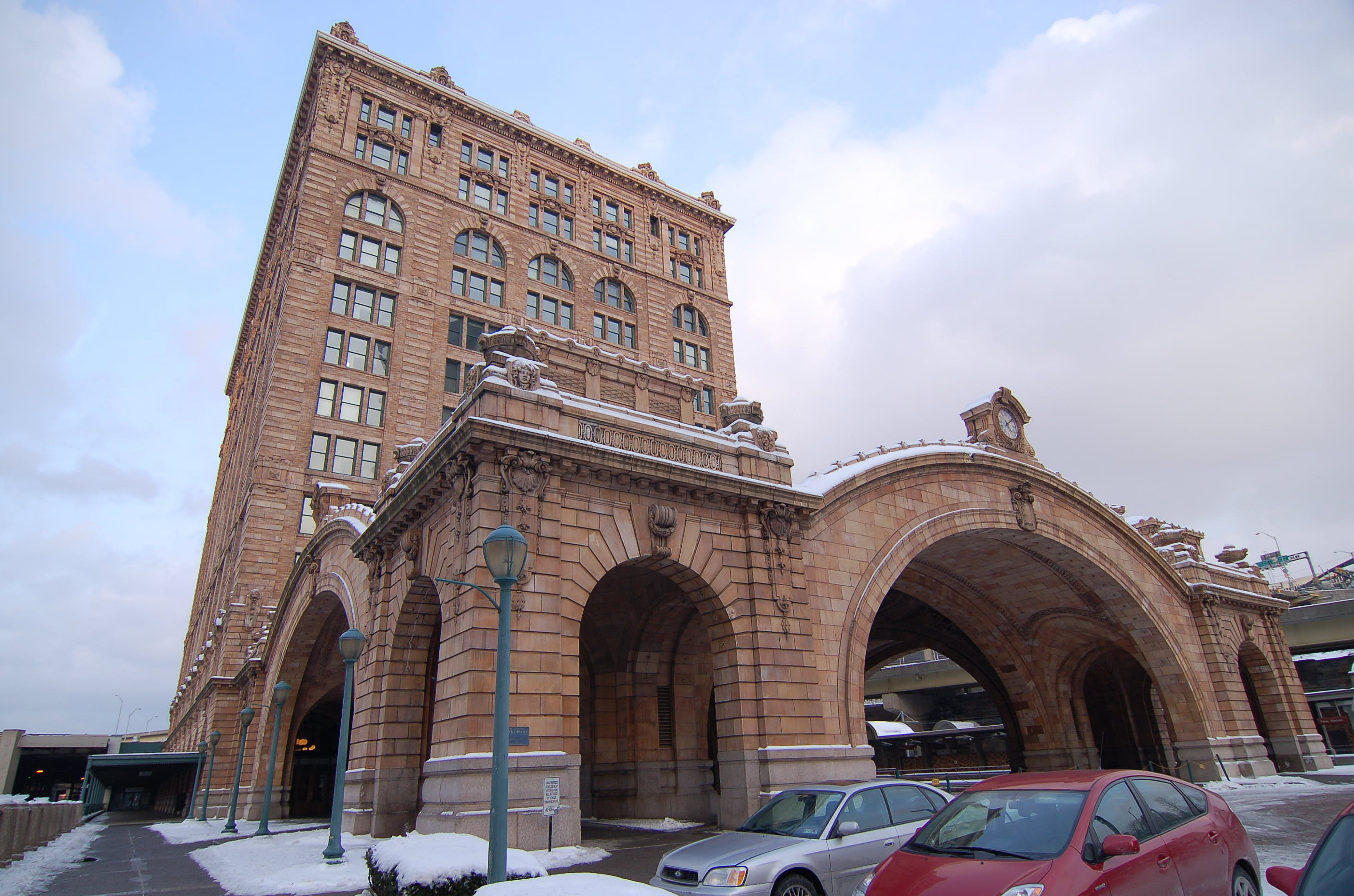
- Station in February 2007

General information
- Location: 1100 Liberty Avenue; Pittsburgh, Pennsylvania; United States
- Coordinates: 40°26′41.1″N 79°59′31.7″W
- Owner: Amtrak
- Lines: NS Pittsburgh Line (Keystone Corridor); NS Fort Wayne Line
- Platforms: 3 + 1 disused
- Tracks: 2 + 3 disused
- Connections: East Busway (at Penn Station) At Grant Street Transportation Center: Greyhound Lines; FlixBus; Fullington Trailways

Construction
- Parking: Yes
- Cycle facilities: Yes
- Accessible: Yes
- Architect: D.H. Burnham & Company
- Architectural style: Beaux Arts

Other information
- Station code: Amtrak: PGH

History
- Opened: 1903
- Rebuilt: 1954, 1988

Passengers
- FY 2025: 141,146 annually (Amtrak)

Services
Preceding station	Amtrak	Following station
Alliance toward Chicago	Floridian	Connellsville toward Miami
Terminus	Pennsylvanian	Greensburg toward New York
Former services
Preceding station	Amtrak	Following station
Alliance toward Chicago	Pennsylvanian 1998–2003	Greensburg toward Philadelphia
Youngstown 1997–2005 toward Chicago	Three Rivers 1995–2005	Greensburg toward New York
Youngstown 1990–1995 toward Chicago	Broadway Limited	Greensburg toward Philadelphia
Canton 1971–1990 toward Chicago	Broadway Limited	Greensburg toward Philadelphia
Columbus toward Kansas City	National Limited	Wilkinsburg toward New York or Washington, D.C.
Terminus	Fort Pitt	Pitcairn toward Altoona
Alliance toward Chicago	Capitol Limited 1981–2024	Connellsville toward Washington, D.C.
Preceding station	PennDOT	Following station
Terminus	Parkway Limited	Wilkinsburg toward Greensburg
Preceding station	Pennsylvania Railroad	Following station
Alliance toward Chicago	Main Line	East Liberty toward New York or Exchange Place
Federal Street toward Chicago	Main Line	East Liberty toward New York or Exchange Place
Terminus	Kittanning Local	East Liberty toward Kittanning
Terminus	Pitcairn Local	28th Street toward North Trafford
Terminus	Pittsburgh – Oil City	East Liberty toward Oil City
Federal Street toward Ashtabula	Ashtabula – Pittsburgh	Terminus
Fourth Avenue toward Washington	Chartiers Branch	Terminus
Federal Street toward Cleveland	Cleveland – Pittsburgh via Youngstown	Terminus
Federal Street toward Cleveland	Cleveland – Pittsburgh via Alliance	Terminus
Federal Street toward Enon	Enon – Pittsburgh	Terminus
Federal Street toward Erie	Erie – Pittsburgh	Terminus
Fourth Avenue toward Brownsville	Monongahela Division	Terminus
Carnegie toward St. Louis	St. Louis – Pittsburgh	Terminus
Fourth Avenue toward Wheeling	Wheeling – Pittsburgh	Terminus

U.S. National Register of Historic Places
- Official name: Rotunda of the Pennsylvania Railroad Station
- Designated: April 11, 1973
- Reference no.: 73001587

U.S. National Register of Historic Places
- Official name: Pennsylvania Railroad Station
- Designated: April 22, 1976
- Reference no.: 76001597

Pittsburgh Landmark – PHLF
- Official name: Pennsylvania Railroad Station Rotunda
- Designated: 1991

Pittsburgh Landmark – PHLF
- Official name: The Pennsylvanian (Union Station)
- Designated: 2003
Location

Union Station, also known as Pennsylvania Station and commonly called Penn Station, is a historic train station in Downtown Pittsburgh, Pennsylvania. It was one of several passenger rail stations that served Pittsburgh during the 20th century; others included the Pittsburgh & Lake Erie Railroad Station, the Baltimore and Ohio Station, and Wabash Pittsburgh Terminal, and it is the only surviving station in active use.

The historic station was designed by Chicago architect Daniel Burnham and built from 1898 to 1904. The station's rotunda was added to the National Register of Historic Places in 1973, followed by the entire building in 1976. In the 1980s, the Burnham station building was converted to apartment use, while Amtrak, the national passenger railroad, moved its operations to an annex on the building's east side.

== History ==
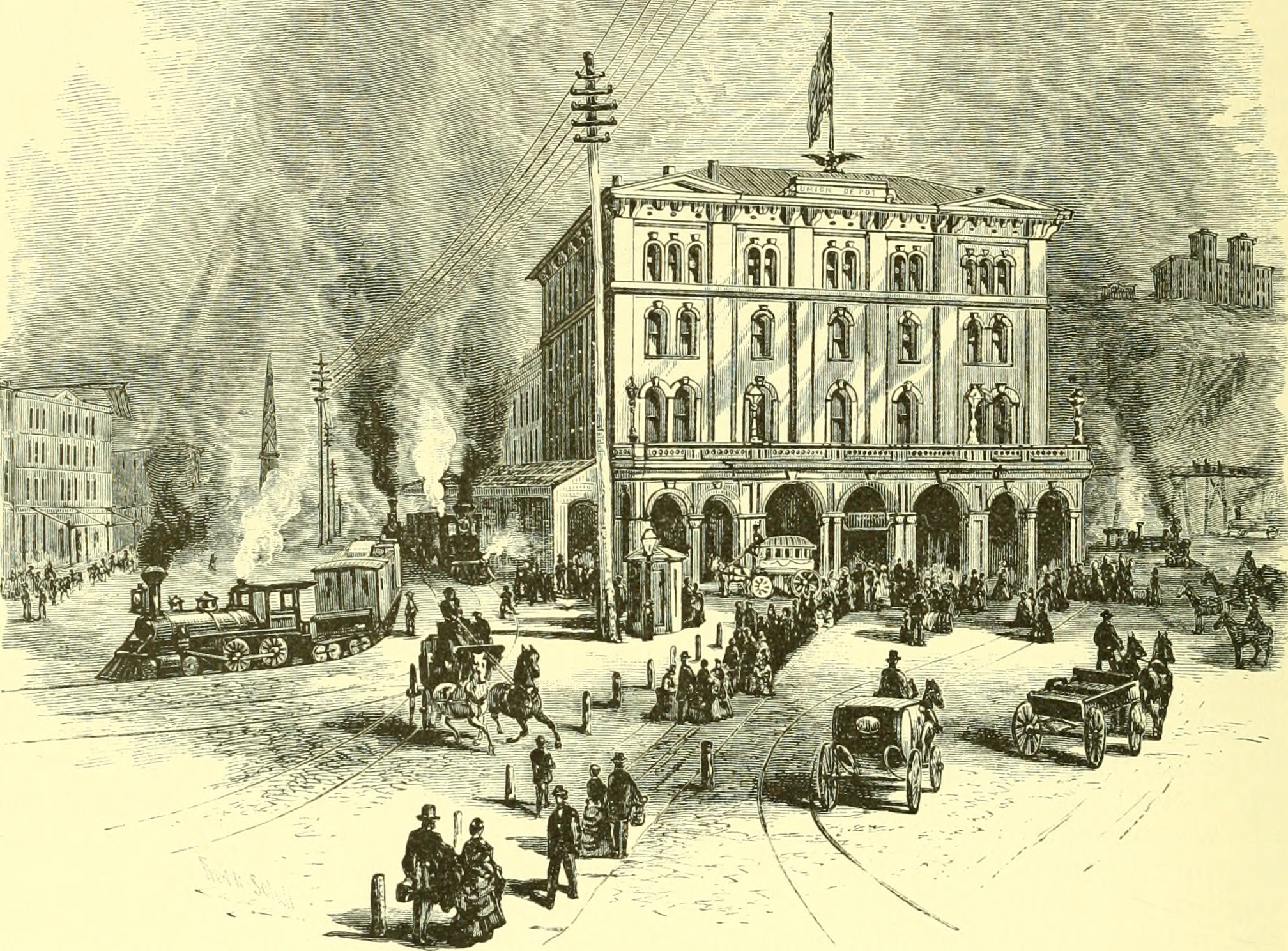
Union Station in 1875

The current station replaced the original Union Station which was destroyed in the Pittsburgh railroad strike of 1877.

Unlike many union stations built in the U.S. to serve the needs of more than one railroad, this facility served only the Pennsylvania Railroad and its subsidiary lines. Thus, Union Station is a misnomer, for that reason, it was renamed in 1912 to match other Pennsylvania Stations. Other major passenger rail carriers served travelers at other stations. For instance, the New York Central used the Pittsburgh & Lake Erie Railroad Station, the Wabash Railroad used Wabash Pittsburgh Terminal, and the Baltimore and Ohio Railroad used both their own Baltimore and Ohio Station and the Pittsburgh & Lake Erie station.

The station building was designed by Chicago architect Daniel Burnham and built between 1898 and 1904. The materials were a grayish-brown terra cotta that looked like brownstone, and brick. Though Burnham is regarded more as a planner and organizer rather than a designer of details, which were left to draftsmen like Peter Joseph Weber, the most extraordinary feature of the monumental train station is its rotunda with corner pavilions. At street level, the rotunda sheltered turning spaces for carriages beneath wide, low vaulted spaces that owed little to any historicist style. Above, the rotunda sheltered passengers in a spectacular waiting room. Burnham's firm completed more than a dozen projects in Pittsburgh, some on quite prominent sites. The rotunda is listed on the National Register of Historic Places. Service began at the station on October 12, 1901.

On January 3, 1954, the Pennsylvania Railroad announced a US$3,600,000 (equivalent to $42,631,579 in 2025) in expansion and renovation for the complex. Into the beginning of the 1970s, the station remained a major stop for several of the PRR's leading east–west trains: Broadway Limited (Chicago–New York), Manhattan Limited (Chicago–New York); Penn Texas (St. Louis–New York) and Spirit of St. Louis (St. Louis–New York).

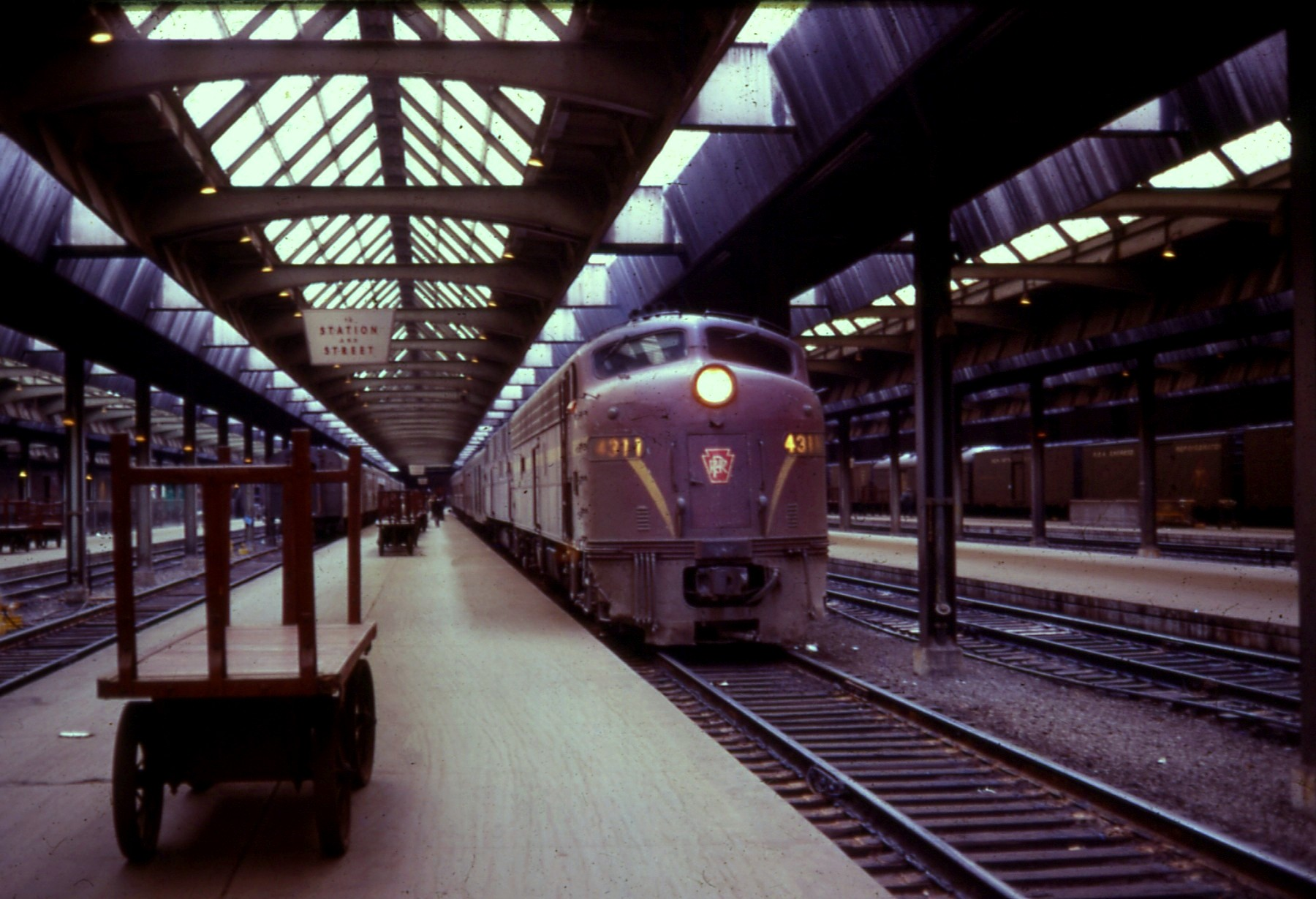
PRR train at Pittsburgh Union Station, March 31, 1968

By the late 1970s the Penn Central Corporation was accepting bids for the complex and it was purchased by the US General Services Administration. There were proposals in 1978 to make the structure into a federal office building, a new city hall, and a senior citizens apartment building. Amtrak proposed that the whole structure remain a train station and rail offices. In 1974, the County Council proposed having the station be the site of the then-planned David L. Lawrence Convention Center. The Buncher Development Company had an option to buy the property as late as 1984.

A $20 million restoration of Union Station began in 1986 to convert the office tower into apartments. It is now called the Pennsylvanian and opened to residents on May 23, 1988. The concourse, which is no longer open to the public, was transformed into a lobby for commercial spaces on the ground floor and the paint cleaned off the great central skylight. The rotunda is now closed to vehicular traffic; modern cars and trucks are too heavy for the brick road surface and risk caving in the roof to the parking garage below it.

=== Current passenger service ===
Union Station continues to serve as an active railway station, but through an annex on the Liberty Avenue side of the building. It is the western terminus of Amtrak's Pennsylvanian route and is along the Floridian route. Until 2005, Pittsburgh was also served by the Three Rivers (a replacement service for the Broadway Limited), an extended version of the Pennsylvanian that terminated in Chicago. Its cancellation marked the first time in Pittsburgh's railway history that the city was served by just two daily passenger trains.

== Architecture ==
In September 1978, The New Yorker art critic Brendan Gill proclaimed that Pittsburgh's Penn Station is "one of the great pieces of Beaux-Arts architecture in America...[one of the] symbols of the nation."

== Pittsburgh Regional Transit ==
Penn Station
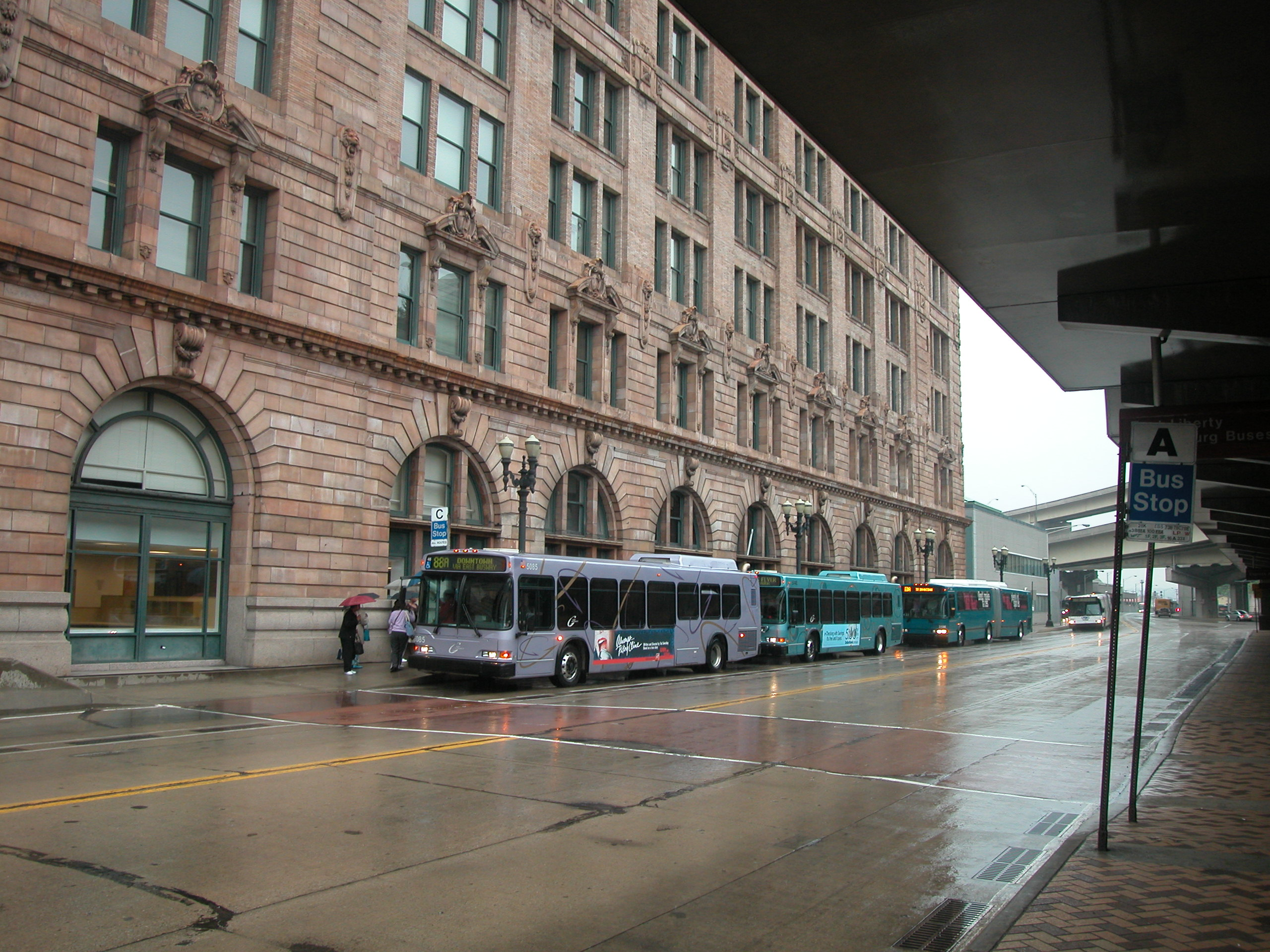
- East Busway buses in front of Union Station

General information
- Location: East Busway at 12th Street; Pittsburgh, Pennsylvania
- Coordinates: 40°26′38″N 79°59′30″W
- Owner: Pittsburgh Regional Transit (PRT)
- Platforms: 2 side platforms (busway); 2 side platforms (light rail)
- Tracks: 2
- Bus routes: PRT East Busway: P1 , P2 , P7 , P10 , P12 , P16 , P17 , P67 , P68 , P69 , P71 , P76 , P78; PRT: G3 G31 (connects to West Busway); PRT: O1 , O5 , O12 (connects to I-279 HOV)
- Connections: PRT: 1, 6, 11, 15, 19L, 29, 31, 39, 40, 44, 86, 87, 88, 91

Construction
- Structure type: At grade
- Parking: Yes, paid
- Accessible: Yes

History
- Opened: May 12, 1988

Passengers
- 2019: 1,339 (weekdays)

Services
Preceding station	Pittsburgh Regional Transit	Following station
Terminus	East Busway	Herron toward Swissvale or Hay Street
Terminus	Shuttle (special events only)	Steel Plaza Terminus
Former services
Preceding station	Port Authority of Allegheny County	Following station
Terminus	42 South Hills Village via Beechview	Steel Plaza toward South Hills Village
Temporary services (January-February 2025)
Preceding station	Pittsburgh Regional Transit	Following station
Terminus	Red Line	Steel Plaza toward South Hills Village
Terminus	Blue Line	Steel Plaza toward South Hills Village
Terminus	Silver Line	Steel Plaza toward Library
Temporary shuttle bus service
Wood Street towards Gateway	96R	Terminus
Location

=== Bus Rapid Transit ===
Penn Station is an at grade station operated by Pittsburgh Regional Transit. The station is located on the Martin Luther King Jr. East Busway.

The East Busway routes P1, P2, P7, P10, P12, P16, P17, P67, P68, P69, P71, P76, P78, the West Busway route G31, and I-279 HOV Busway routes O1, O5, and O12, and local bus routes 1, 6, 11, 15, 19L, 29, 31, 39, 40, and 44 all serve this station. Routes 86, 87, 88 and 91 stop just outside of the station on Liberty and Penn Avenues.

=== Light Rail Transit ===
There is also a seldom used light rail station at the site. It opened in 1988 with regular shuttle service to Steel Plaza station, as well as two afternoon rush-hour trains on the 42S (now the Red Line). However, the station was difficult to integrate into other services, since it used a single-tracked former Pennsylvania Railroad tunnel. This tunnel travels beneath the US Steel Tower, and the building's structural supports are on each side of the tunnel, prohibiting the installation of a second track. The shuttle service was discontinued in 1993, but the two 42S afternoon rush-hour trains continued to serve the station until 2007. Since 2007, the station has seen occasional use, mostly for charters or special events, such as part of the agency's detoured transportation routes following Super Bowl XLV on February 6, 2011, as part of the "Railvolution" transit convention in October 2018, and during concrete repair work in the downtown tunnels between Steel Plaza and Gateway Station in March 2023.

Currently, there are plans to revive light rail service to Penn Station with the Brown Line.

== Suburban transit connections ==
- Beaver County Transit Authority Route 1
- Butler Transit Authority
- Fayette Area Coordinated Transportation Commuter
- New Castle Area Transit Authority Route 71
- Washington City Transit Washington-Pittsburgh
- Westmoreland County Transit Authority Routes 1F, 2F, 3F, 14F

== Intercity bus connections ==
=== Grant Street Transportation Center ===
Across the street is the Grant Street Transportation Center. It serves as an intercity bus station for:

- Amtrak Thruway
- Greyhound Lines
- Fullington Trailways
- Mid Mon Valley Transit Authority
- Mountain Line Transit Authority

== Gallery ==
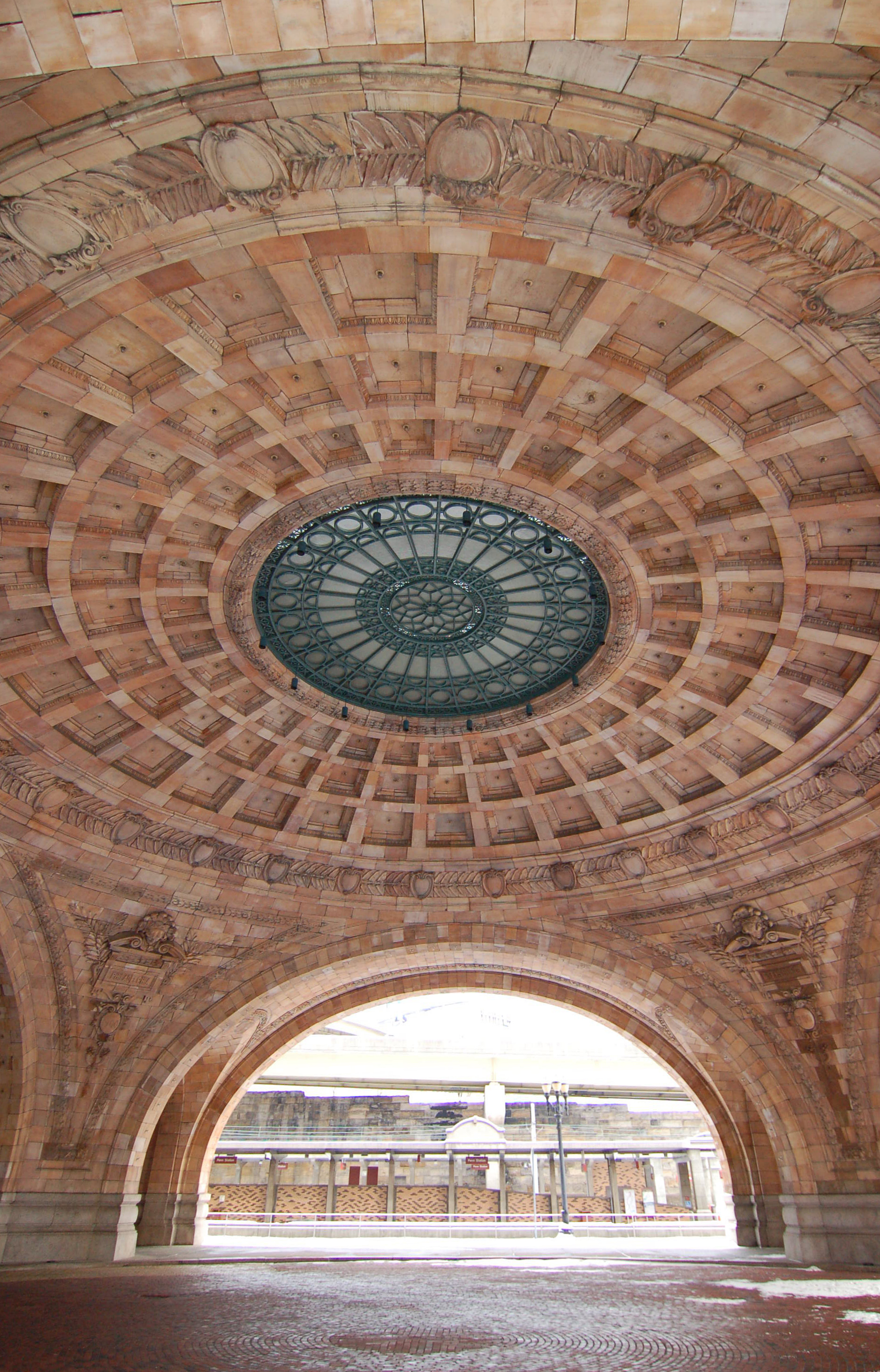
The rotunda

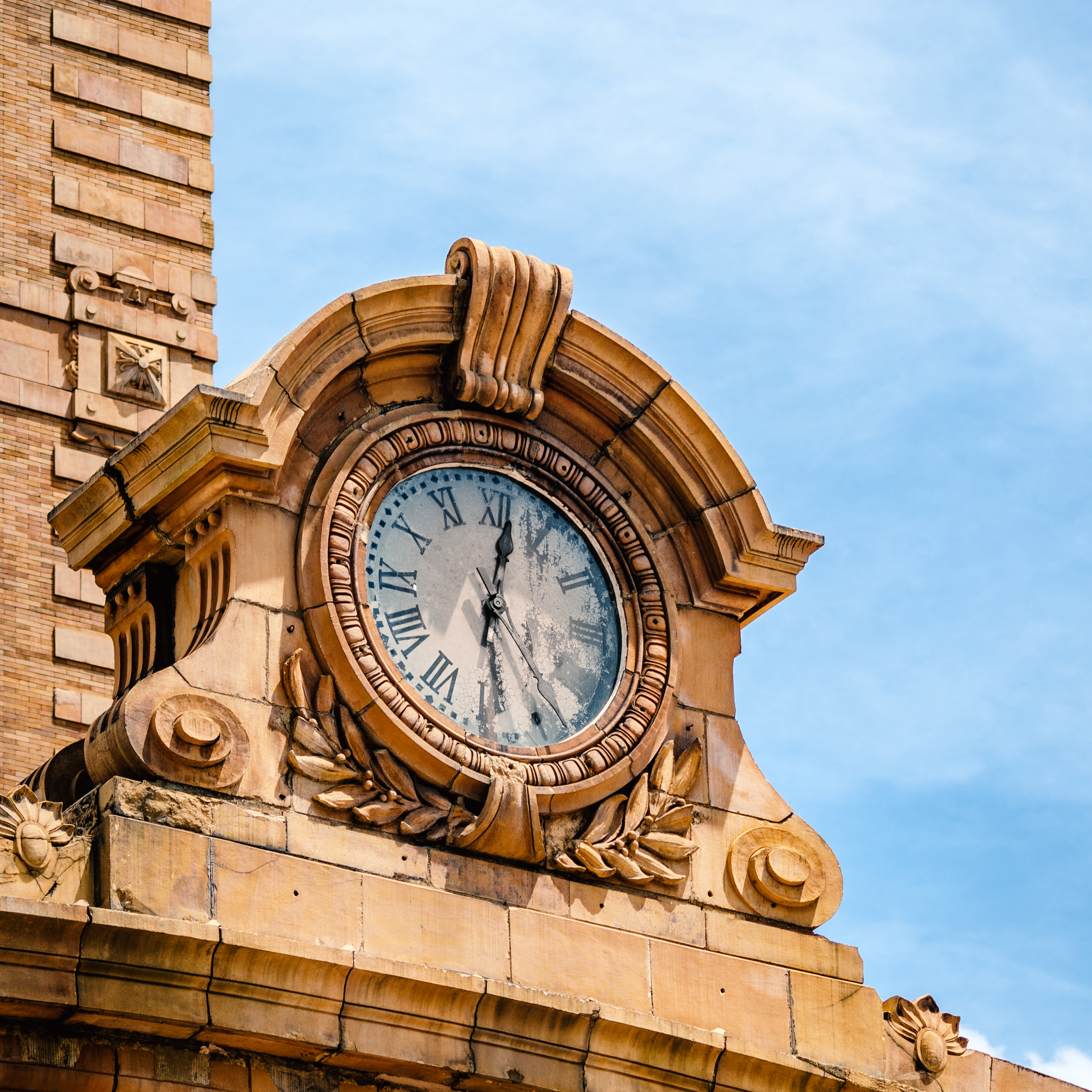
Exterior clock

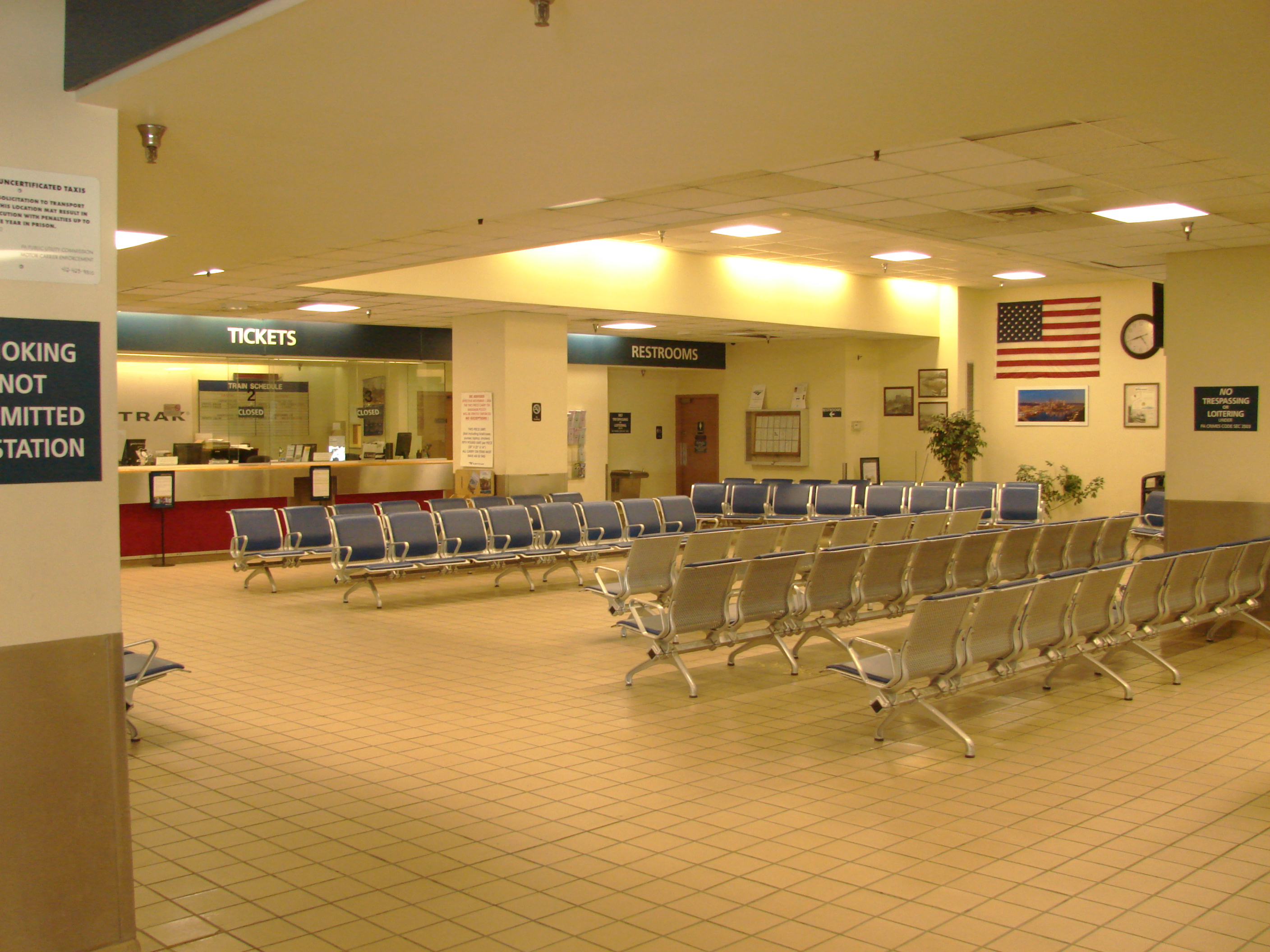
Amtrak annex interior

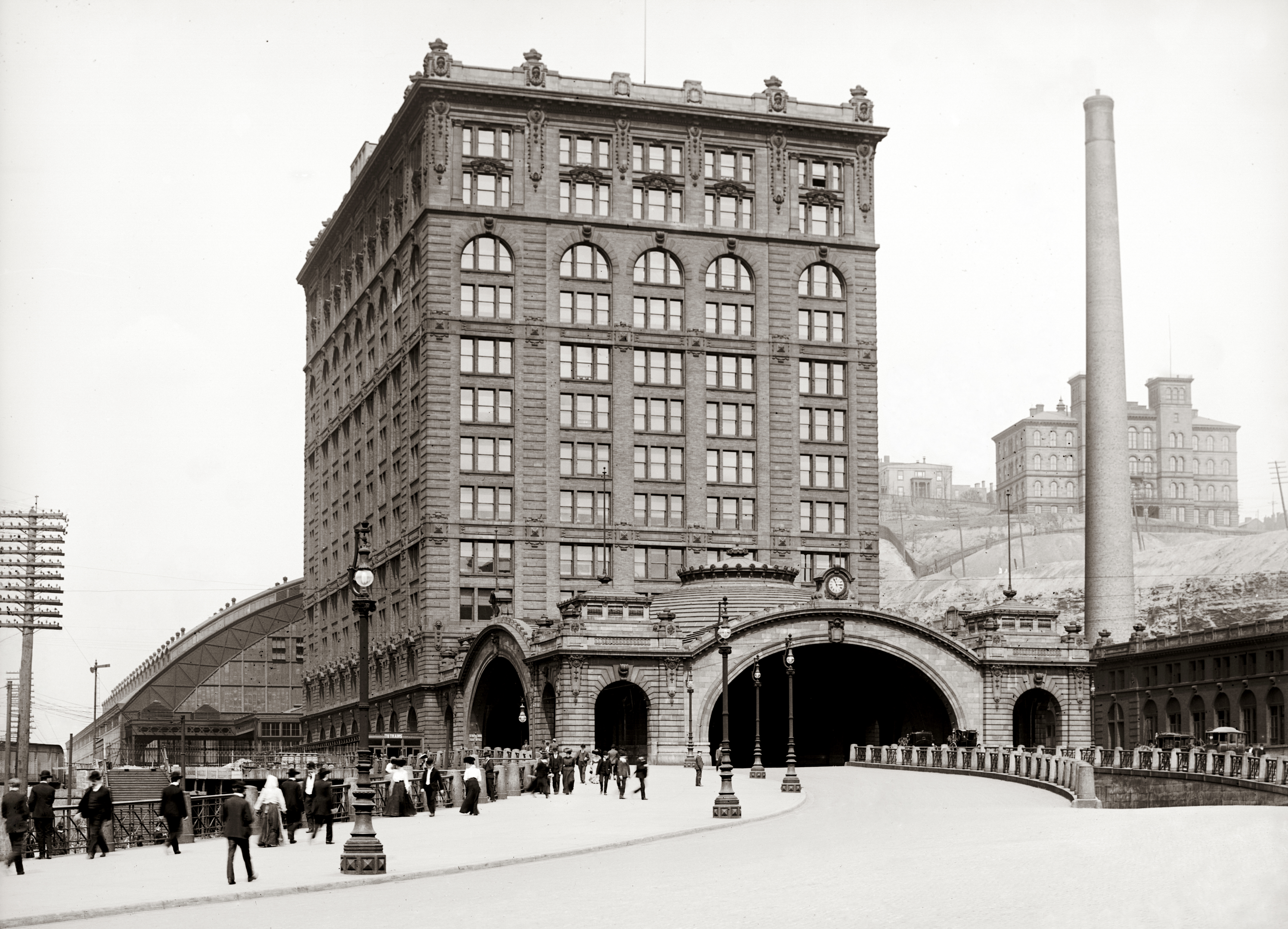
Union Station, ca. 1910

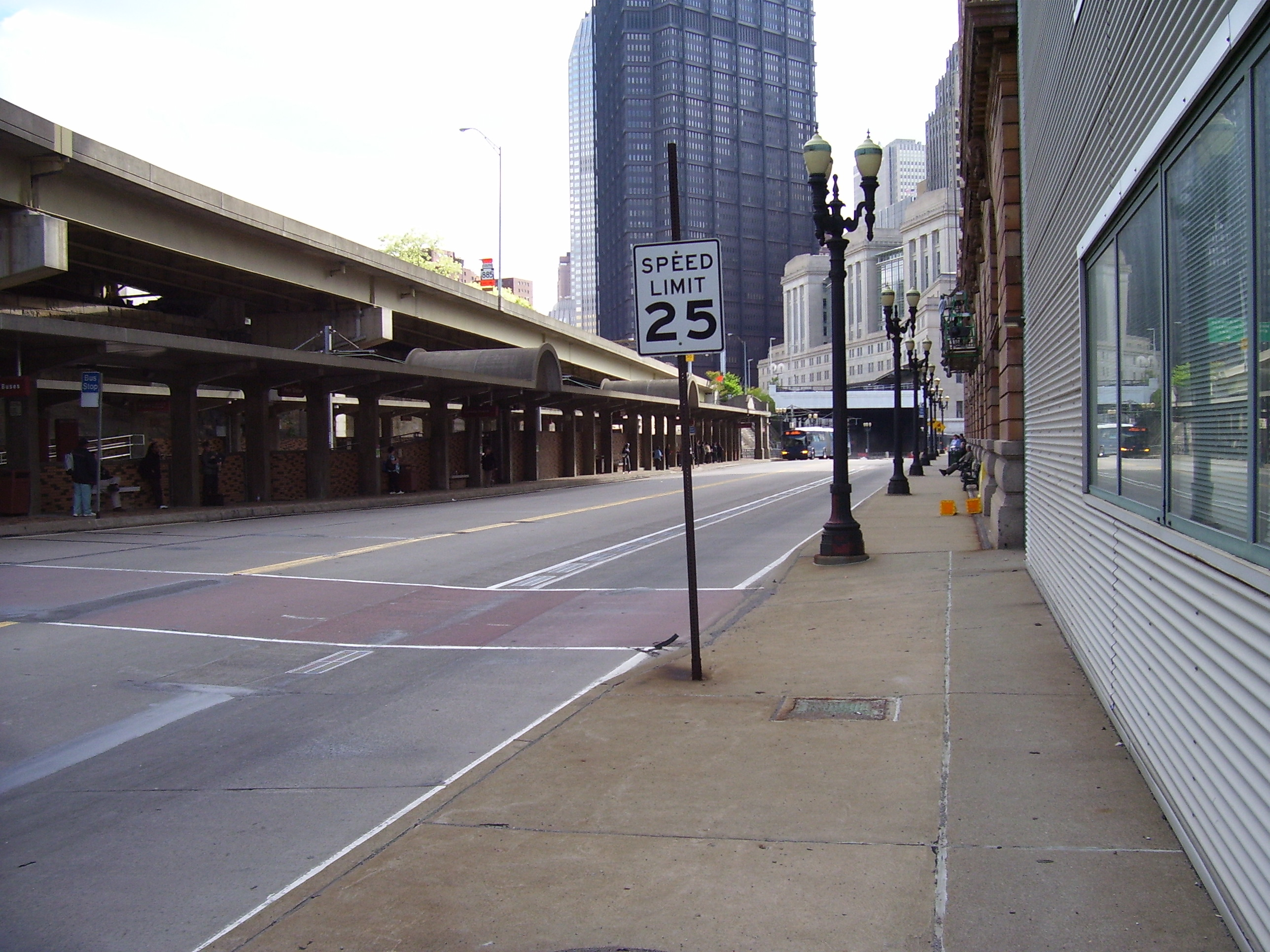
East Busway station near the railroad building.

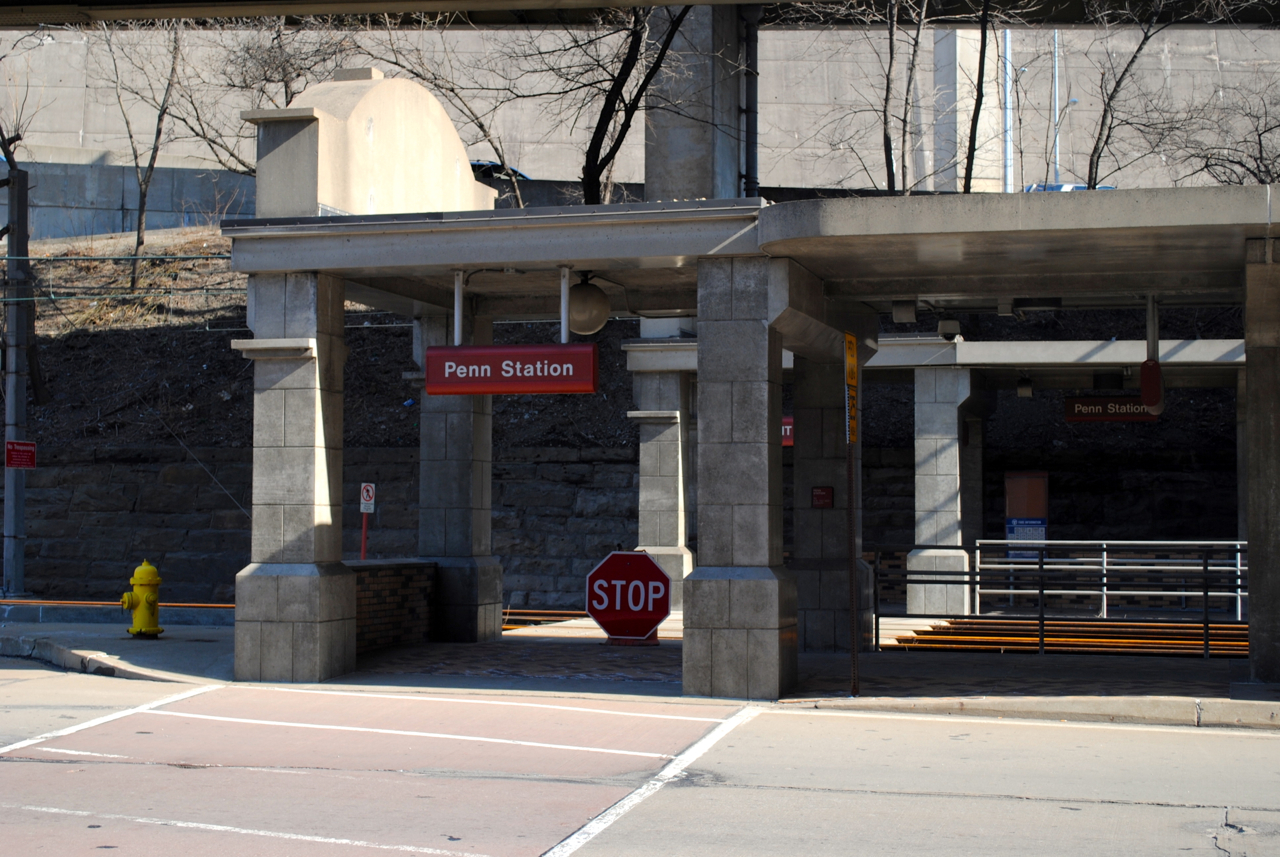
T station, with no regular service since 1993.

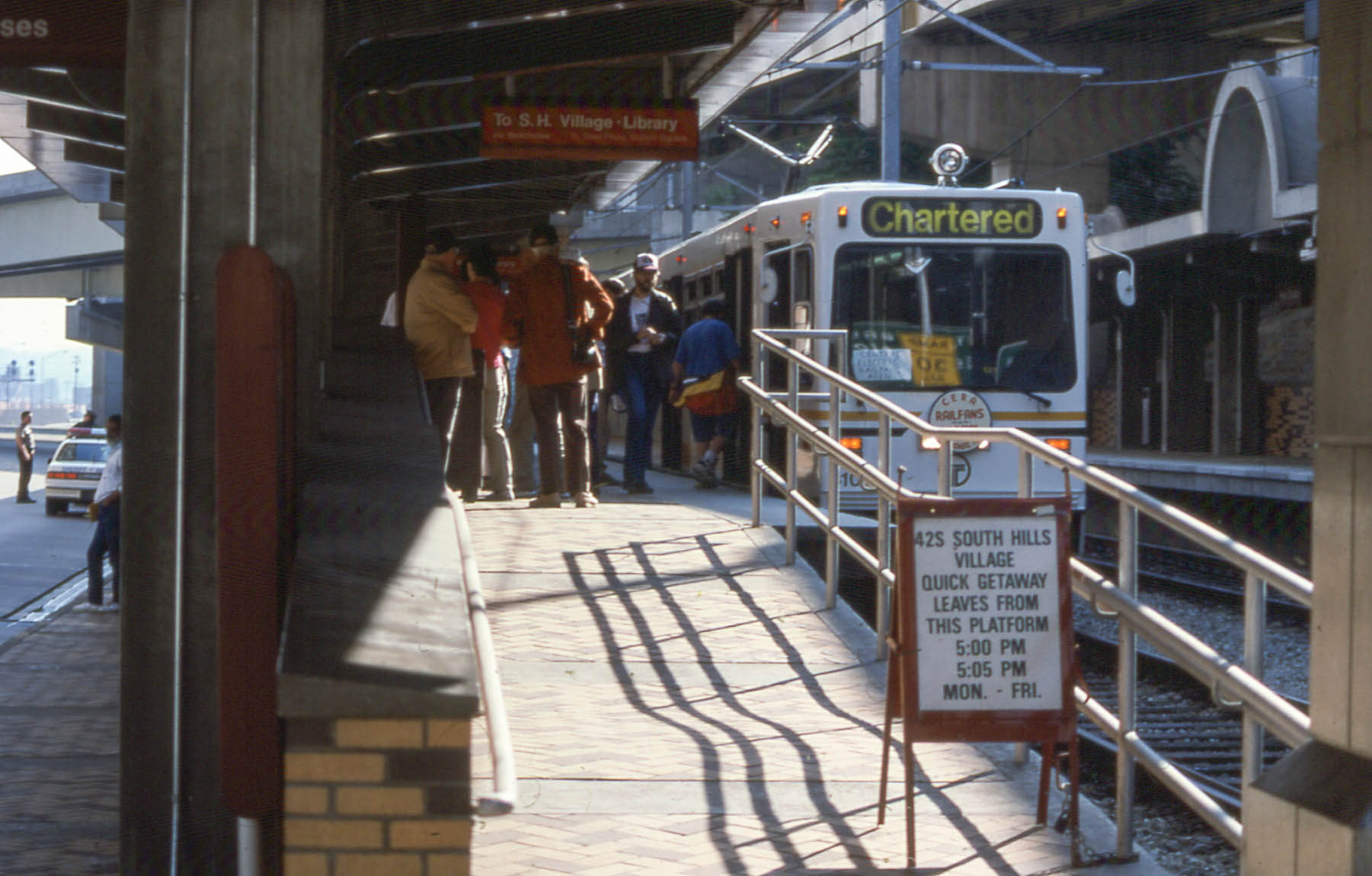
T station in 1994 showing chartered light rail train.

== See also ==
- Pittsburgh & Lake Erie Railroad Station
- Baltimore and Ohio Station (Pittsburgh)
- Grant Street Station
- Wabash Pittsburgh Terminal
