= Mestad =

Mestad is a surname. Notable people with the surname include:

- Henrik Mestad (born 1964), Norwegian actor
- Mette Mestad (born 1958), Norwegian biathlete
- Viking Mestad (1930–2013), Norwegian banker and politician

== See also ==
- Mesta (disambiguation)
