= Svarte pantere =

- Directed by: Thomas Robsahm
- Written by: Thomas Robsahm
- Based on: Tarjei Vesaas's novel Brannen
- Produced by: Thomas Robsahm; Halvor Bodin
- Starring: Henrik Mestad; Anneli Drecker; Bjarte Hjelmeland; Guro Sibeko; Bettina Banoun; Bjørn Sundquist
- Cinematography: Harald Paalgard
- Edited by: Inge-Lise Langfeldt
- Music by: Pee Jay
- Distributed by: Speranza Film; Favola Film AS
- Release date: October 15, 1992
- Running time: 85 minutes
- Country: Norway
- Language: Norwegian

Svarte pantere: Rebels with a Cause (Black Panthers: Rebels with a Cause) is a Norwegian crime drama and youth film from 1992 directed by Thomas Robsahm. The film is about a group of young and idealistic animal liberation activists who call themselves the "Black Panthers." They live together in a collective in the countryside and engage in illegal activism at night. In the end, they are arrested by the police, and the authorities use the case to blacken both them and the case as much as possible. The leading roles are played by Henrik Mestad, Anneli Drecker, Bjarte Hjelmeland, Guro Sibeko, Bettina Banoun, and Bjørn Sundquist.

== Reception ==
Svarte pantere received a "die throw" of four out of six in Verdens Gang, Arbeiderbladet, and Dagbladet, whereas Aftenposten gave it three.

== Cast ==
- Anneli Drecker as Sonia
- Henrik Mestad as Marius
- Lars Eilert Arentz-Hansen
- Bettina Banoun as Bettina
- Martin Bjørnersen as Roger
- Jan Grønli as a fur farmer
- Bjarte Hjelmeland as Erik
- Aamund Johannesen as a veterinarian
- Lasse Kolsrud as the defense attorney
- Christine Elise Robsahm as Kristin
- Guro Sibeko as Lise
- Bjørn Sundquist as a police investigator
- Jan Fredrik Varden as the prosecutor
