= Latimer station =

Latimer station could refer to:

- Latimer station (PAAC), a light rail station in Pittsburgh, Pennsylvania
- Latimer Road tube station, a London Underground station
- Chalfont & Latimer tube station, a London Underground station
