= S.O.S. (1999 film) =

- Directed by: Thomas Robsahm
- Starring: Gianmarco Tognazzi; Jacqueline Lustig
- Release date: 27 August 1999
- Running time: 90 minutes
- Countries: Norway; Italy
- Language: Italian

S.O.S. is a 1999 Norwegian-Italian comedy film directed by Thomas Robsahm. It won the 2000 Amanda Award for best film.

== Cast ==
- Gianmarco Tognazzi - Angelo
- Jacqueline Lustig - Alba
- Kjersti Holmen - Ellen
- Ricky Memphis - Police Officer
