= Sarah station =

Sarah
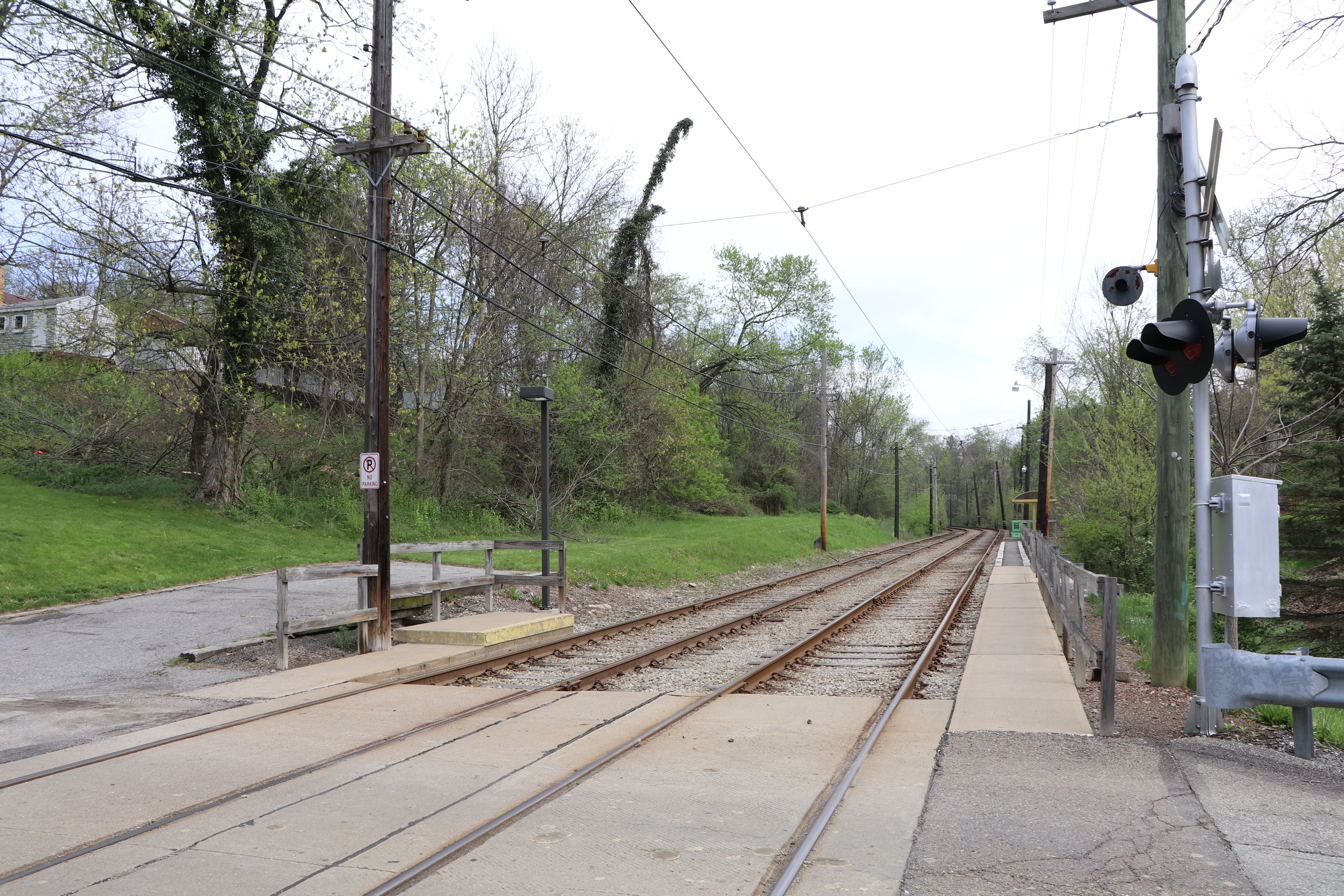
- Looking north

General information
- Location: Library Road at Sarah Street; Bethel Park, Pennsylvania
- Coordinates: 40.3156°N 80.0300°W
- Owner: Pittsburgh Regional Transit
- Line: Library Line
- Platforms: 2 side platforms
- Tracks: 2

Construction
- Structure type: At-grade
- Accessible: No

History
- Rebuilt: 1987
- Former names: Boyers

Passengers
- 2018: 32 (weekday boardings)

Services
| Preceding station | Pittsburgh Regional Transit | Following station |
|---|---|---|
| Munroe toward Allegheny | Silver Line | Logan toward Library |
Former services
| Preceding station | Port Authority of Allegheny County | Following station |
|---|---|---|
| Latimer Closed 2012 toward Allegheny | Blue Line Library | Logan toward Library |
Location

Sarah station is a stop on the Pittsburgh Light Rail network, operated by Pittsburgh Regional Transit, serving Bethel Park, Pennsylvania. It is a small, street-level stop used by local residents traveling to and from Downtown Pittsburgh. The station consists of two low-level side platforms for street-level boarding and is not accessible.

During the days of PRT's predecessor Pittsburgh Railways, the stop was known as Boyers. The house of its original namesake's farm still stands a short distance away across Rt. 88, listed by the Pittsburgh History and Landmarks Foundation. It is the last remaining rural structure along the former interurban right-of-way that both still stands and is still served by Pittsburgh Regional Transit.
