= Rød snø =

Television series

Rød Snø (Red Snow) is a Norwegian/Swedish thriller television series made in 1985, directed by Bo Hermansson and written by Tony Williamson. It stars Tomas von Brömssen, Kjersti Holmen and Sven Nordin.

== Synopsis ==
Rød Snø portrays the war-time situation in Nössemark, Sweden, just across the Norwegian border during November 1942. Here lies a small motel called Linds Pensionat, the situation at which is supposedly carefree. But across the border, the war rages on, and Sweden — despite their neutrality — is not left alone. There are spies everywhere, and nobody knows exactly whom to trust and who not to.

The series begins with Anne Eriksen (Holmen) on her way to visit the Linds, as she used to spend almost every vacation there when she was younger. Almost immediately, strange things begin to happen, things that are unmistakably related to the war. The people at the motel suspect somebody in their circle is working for the Germans, and the list of suspects grows further with every new visitor.
