= Mesta (disambiguation) =

The Mesta was a powerful association of sheep holders in the medieval Crown of Castile.

Mesta may also refer to:

== People ==
- Perle Mesta (1889–1975), American society figure, political hostess, and ambassador to Luxembourg

== Organizations ==
- Mesta (company), a Norwegian company primarily building roads
- Mesta Machinery, a former major US manufacturer of heavy machinery from 1898 until 1983, founded by George Mesta (1863–1925), the husband of Perle Mesta

== Places ==
- Mesta River, a river in Bulgaria and Greece
- Mesta, Greece, a village on the island of Chios, Greece
- Mesta, Bulgaria, a village in Bulgaria

== Other uses ==
- Mesta station, a light rail station in Pittsburgh, Pennsylvania, United States
- Imset or Mesta, in Egyptian mythology, a funerary deity, one of the Four sons of Horus
- Roselle (plant) or Meśta, a species of hibiscus native to the Old World tropics, cultivated for the production for bast fibre

== See also ==
- Óláfs saga Tryggvasonar en mesta, one of the kings' sagas
