= Logan station (Pittsburgh) =

Light rail station in Bethel Park, Pennsylvania

Logan
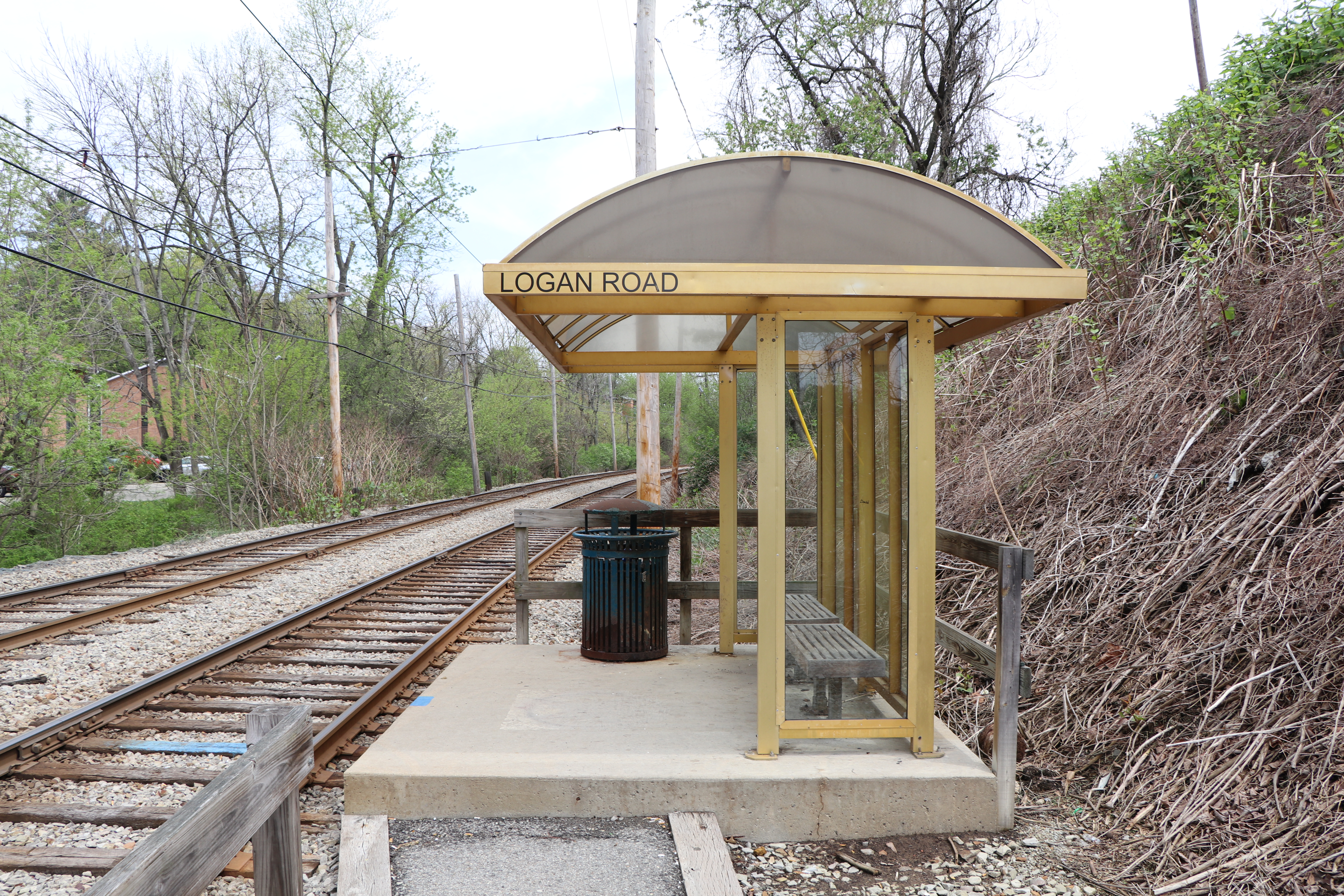
- The inbound shelter

General information
- Location: Library Road at Logan Road; Bethel Park, Pennsylvania
- Coordinates: 40.3112°N 80.0333°W
- Owner: Pittsburgh Regional Transit
- Line: Library Line
- Platforms: 2 side platforms
- Tracks: 2

Construction
- Structure type: At-grade
- Accessible: No

History
- Rebuilt: 1987

Passengers
- 2018: 57 (weekday boardings)

Services
Preceding station	Pittsburgh Regional Transit	Following station
Sarah toward Allegheny	Silver Line	King's School toward Library
Location

Logan station is a stop on the Pittsburgh Light Rail network, operated by Pittsburgh Regional Transit, serving Bethel Park, Pennsylvania. It is a small, street-level stop used by local residents traveling to and from Downtown Pittsburgh. The station consists of two low-level side platforms for street-level boarding and is not accessible.
