= Munroe station (Pittsburgh) =

Munroe
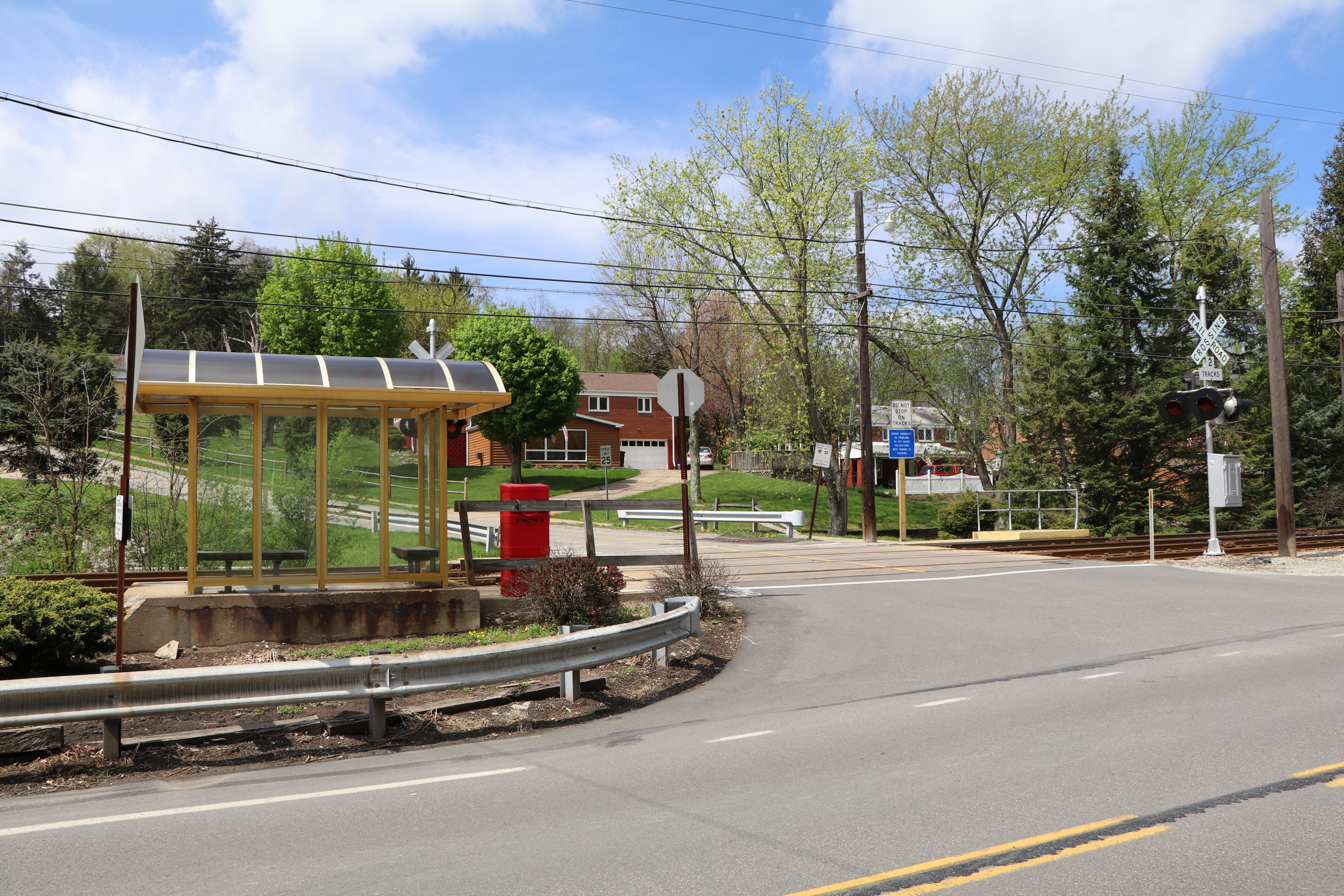

General information
- Location: Brighwood Road at West Munroe Street; Bethel Park, Pennsylvania
- Coordinates: 40.3229°N 80.0297°W
- Owner: Pittsburgh Regional Transit
- Line: Library Line
- Platforms: 2 side platforms
- Tracks: 2

Construction
- Structure type: At-grade
- Accessible: No

History
- Rebuilt: 1987

Passengers
- 2018: 30 (weekday boardings)

Services
Preceding station	Pittsburgh Regional Transit	Following station
South Park toward Allegheny	Silver Line	Sarah toward Library
Former services
Preceding station	Port Authority of Allegheny County	Following station
South Park toward Allegheny	Blue Line Library	Latimer Closed 2012 toward Library
Location

Munroe station is a stop on the Pittsburgh Light Rail network, operated by Pittsburgh Regional Transit, serving Bethel Park, Pennsylvania. It is a small, street-level stop used by local residents traveling to and from Downtown Pittsburgh. The station consists of two low-level side platforms for street-level boarding and is not accessible.

The stop straddles West Munroe Street so that stationary rail vehicles do not block the road. There is a small shelter for northbound passengers.
