= Occupied =

Norwegian TV thriller series

- Promotional poster
- Also known as: Okkupert
- Genre: Political thriller
- Created by: Jo Nesbø; Erik Skjoldbjærg; Karianne Lund
- Written by: Erik Richter Strand; Ina Bruhn; Björn Paqualin; Harald Rosenløw Eeg; Jan Trygve Røyneland; Hilde Susan Jægtnes
- Directed by: Erik Skjoldbjærg; John Andreas Andersen; Pål Sletaune; Erik Richter Strand; Eva Sørhaug
- Starring: Ane Dahl Torp; Henrik Mestad; Eldar Skar; Ingeborga Dapkūnaitė; Selome Emnetu; Janne Heltberg
- Theme music composer: Sivert Høyem
- Composer: Nicholas Sillitoe
- Countries of origin: Norway, France, Sweden
- Original languages: Norwegian, English, French, Russian
- No. of seasons: 3
- No. of episodes: 24

Production
- Executive producers: Anni Faurbye Fernandez; Line Winther Skyum Funch; Berna Levin; Jo Nesbø; Ole Søndberg
- Producers: Marianne Gray; Gudny Hummelvoll
- Production location: Norway
- Cinematography: John Andreas Andersen; Johan-Fredrik Bødtker
- Editors: Sverrir Kristjánsson; Jens Christian Fodstad
- Running time: 45 min
- Production company: Yellow Bird
- Budget: kr 90 million

Original release
- Network: TV2
- Release: 4 October 2015 – 2 January 2020

Occupied (Norwegian: Okkupert) is a Norwegian political thriller TV series that premiered on TV2 on 5 October 2015. Based on an original idea by Jo Nesbø, the series is co-created with Karianne Lund and Erik Skjoldbjærg. Season 2 premiered on 10 October 2017. The third and final season started airing in Scandinavia on 5 December 2019, and was released in many countries via Netflix on 31 December 2019.

With a budget of 90 million kr (US$11 million), the series is the most expensive Norwegian production to date and has been sold to Belgium, Canada, the Czech Republic, Denmark, Estonia, Finland, France, Germany, Iceland, Luxembourg, the Netherlands, Poland, Portugal, Serbia, Sweden, Spain, and the United Kingdom. It is also streamed by Netflix in Australia, Belgium, Canada, Ireland, Israel, India, the Netherlands, New Zealand, Singapore, South Africa, the United Kingdom, and the United States.

The series depicts a fictional near future in which, following a catastrophic hurricane attributed to global warming, Norway's newly elected green party Ny Kraft Prime Minister has stopped the country's oil and gas production. Russia, with support from the European Union, occupies Norway to restore its oil and gas production, in response to a Europe-wide energy crisis.

== Plot ==
=== Season One ===
In the near future, Middle East turmoil and the US withdrawal from NATO triggers an energy crisis. A catastrophic hurricane fueled by climate change devastates Norway, killing 700–800 people and causing untold physical and economic damage. The Norwegian (fictitious) green party Ny Kraft is swept to power in response, and idealistic Prime Minister Jesper Berg plans to develop thorium-based nuclear power as a viable alternative to oil. To this end, Berg cuts off all fossil fuel production, intensifying the energy crisis in the continent. The European Union, in desperation, acquiesces to a Russian-led invasion of Norway.

Berg attends the inauguration of the first thorium plant, proclaiming the end of fossil fuels. As he leaves the event, Russian special forces kidnap Berg and fly him by helicopter to a forest. There, via video chat, EU Commissioner Pierre Anselme demands that he restart Norwegian oil production or face a full-scale invasion. Berg refuses and attempts to escape upon seeing a civilian approach the helicopter. The soldiers shoot the man, forcing Berg to agree to the EU's demands. Berg is released and is picked up by his bodyguard, Martin Djupvik, who has been pursuing the helicopter. To conceal the nature of the occupation, Berg spins the presence of the Russians as a temporary "energy partnership". This cover story unravels as a series of events complicates Norwegian–Russian interactions over the ensuing months while Berg's political position disintegrates as he tries to avoid bloodshed and war.

At a ceremony on Constitution Day, a member of the Royal Guard named Stefan Christensen attempts to assassinate Russian ambassador Irina Sidorova, but is thwarted by Djupvik. He is thanked by the ambassador after the event, and becomes an important player in relations between the Norwegian government and Russian embassy. A Norwegian military unit abducts two Russian officials who had been urging the Commander of the Royal Guard, Harald Vold, to surrender himself to Russian custody on suspicion of hatching the assassination plot, instigating a hostage situation with the demands being Christensen's release. Djupvik assists in resolving the situation, and afterwards is assigned by Police Security Service chief Wenche Arnesen to work on protecting Russian officials.

Bente Norum, who owns a restaurant opposite the Russian embassy in Oslo, becomes increasingly involved with the Russians, who become her primary customers. This does not sit well with her husband Thomas Eriksen, a journalist who is outspoken against the Russian presence in Norway. Their marriage becomes strained and Bente develops a relationship with a Russian embassy official named Nikolai.

When a Russian agent is killed in a hit and run in front of the embassy, the Russian government demands that Norway extradite the driver, a suspected Chechen terrorist named Elbek Musajev. Djupvik discovers the death was an accident caused by the man's son Iljas rather than a deliberate attack. After being sentenced to two years prison, Elbek commits suicide to avoid being deported to Russia. Iljas, blaming Djupvik for his father's death, meets Christensen, and the two plot vengeance against the Russians and the Norwegian government who accommodate them. They proceed to recruit Vold and a nationalist academic, Eivind Birkeland, and form the rebel group Free Norway (Fritt Norge).

Free Norway's first action is to detonate a bomb at the PST headquarters, injuring Djupvik. Thomas Eriksen is contacted by Christensen, who meets him and threatens his family, accusing them of being Russian sympathisers. A gas production facility in Viksund is then attacked, killing many Russian workers and causing the Russians to cancel their planned withdrawal from Norway. Tensions increase further as Russian troops enter Finnmark and a Russian naval fleet conducts exercises off the coast of northern Norway; Eriksen is found dead after going to investigate. Prime Minister Berg asks the EU to protect Norway's sovereignty, but the EU fails to act decisively.

PST chief Arnesen secretly contacts and assists Free Norway after discovering she has a terminal brain tumor. The group begins a recruitment drive of retired military personnel and prisoners. Berg has in the meantime set up a caretaker government under the orders of the King of Norway after losing a no-confidence motion from his own party. After discovering that Russian sleeper agents are entering the country illegally, Berg begins interning and deporting them back to Russia. In response, Russian "terrorists" seemingly armed with suicide vests storm Berg's office and hold him hostage. Berg is rescued and evacuated to the US embassy, setting up a government in internal exile. It emerges that the oil refinery attack was actually a false flag attack staged by the Russian government as a justification to extend their presence in Norway. When Bente Norum's daughter, Maja Norum, discovers evidence that the Russian military killed Eriksen, Bente expels Russian staff members from her restaurant in retaliation. After her stepson Petter becomes involved in Free Norway's activities, she agrees to provide the group information if he is kept out of it.

Berg, taking sanctuary in the US ambassador's residence, takes every opportunity to attempt to try to involve the United States in dislodging the Russians, but the Americans refuse involvement. Berg attempts to fly Russian internees to Svalbard, but the plane is intercepted by Russian fighter jets and forced to turn back. Events spiral further when, after Berg calls on the public to resist the Russian occupation in a public broadcast, Free Norway kidnaps Sidorova and one of her bodyguards. They execute the latter live over the internet and claim that they will do the same to Sidorova if Russia does not withdraw from Norway within 24 hours. In response, Russian special forces seize Oslo Airport and fly several military officials into Norway. Berg conducts a CNN interview denouncing Free Norway and again calling on the US to assist Norway; this prompts the US ambassador to mildly poison Berg's food, requiring him to be transported to hospital, off the embassy grounds. Djupvik and Bø track down and rescue Sidorova, and Iljas Musajev is killed by Djupvik in the process. Assisted by Bente Norum, Free Norway assassinate a high-ranking Russian general and kill several Russian soldiers in front of the Russian embassy. Bente sells her restaurant and leaves after being warned by Nikolai that he can no longer protect her.

The assassination is taken as an act of war, and Russian troops begin crossing the border into Norway. After her health deteriorates and she is told she can no longer work, Arnesen records and releases a video revealing her defection and claiming she is going into hiding as the leader of Free Norway. She then commits suicide at a church, and her body is cremated by the priest. Unaware of her death, Djupvik and Russian authorities seek to locate her. Meanwhile, Berg is kidnapped and taken via helicopter to a Free Norway resistance camp, where he is informed of Arnesen's defection and the escalation of the conflict. Upon landing, he is welcomed by Vold and asked if he is ready to fight for his country.

=== Season Two ===
After being kidnapped, Berg is proclaimed as the new leader of Free Norway, and the group carries out a guerrilla campaign against the occupation, attacking both Russian and Norwegian forces and staging terror attacks throughout the country, nearly plummeting the country into a civil war. Six months later, however, the insurgents have lost much of their strength due to heavy Russian military and Norwegian police action. Berg is thus forced into exile in neighboring Sweden, which had supported the initial Russian invasion as a member of the EU. Berg's replacement as prime minister, fellow party member Anders Knudsen, proves unable to handle the pressure and resigns. Following his exile to Sweden, Berg attempts to form a parallel government-in-exile. While acting as a go-between for Berg and the leaders of Norway's parliament, the Storting, his political adviser and lover Anita Rygh sees her political role marginalized. Rygh instead recommends to the majority party that they form a new government. The President of the Storting refuses, but offers her the prime ministerial position instead. She accepts, severing her ties with Berg.

A Coast Guard officer approaches Berg with news that the Russians are installing cruise missile launchers on the oil installation of Melkøya in northern Norway. From his position in Sweden, Berg contacts the insurgents and orders them to get photographic evidence. Under the guise of an inspection, a platoon of guardsmen independently confronts members of a Russian private military company stationed there. One of the guardsmen, a naturalized Somali immigrant named Faisal Abdi, transmits a video of the missiles, but a gunfight breaks out and the guardsmen are captured and brought to a Russian prison. The leader of the platoon dies after being hit by gunfire. The return of the soldiers becomes a source of tension between both nations and Rygh's first true test as prime minister.

Since Russians were killed in the incident, the Russian authorities are unwilling to return the soldiers to Norway. Djupvik's wife Hilde drafts a plan to have them tried in Norway with a Russian lay judge presiding; the Russians agree, and all of the soldiers are found guilty and given the maximum sentence (21 years imprisonment). Faisal's girlfriend Frida Engø and her hacker friend Leon Tangen launch Free Our Soldiers (FOS), a peaceful protest group demanding the release of the soldiers.

Bente Norum has opened a hotel with a Russian business partner named Zoya. As with the restaurant, this venue is popular among Russians and becomes a profitable venture. When a powerful Russian oligarch, Konstantin Minnikov, stays at the hotel, Norum is approached by a resistance agent who asks she copy the contents of Minnikov's phone and send it to them. She initially declines, but after discovering that Minnikov has secretly bought out Zoya's share of the hotel, she does so. Minnikov's daughter Nadja replaces Zoya as Norum's business partner, and befriends Norum's daughter Maja. Meanwhile, Nikolai has moved in with Norum and Maja.

Djupvik, now head of the PST, continues to walk a fine line between allegiances. After spending months trying to track down Arnesen, he interviews the priest at the church, who admits she has been dead the entire time. Having located the Free Norway camp, the Norwegian police capture Vold and other insurgents. The Security Service discovers that Berg is using the video game DayZ to communicate with the Free Norway insurgents. When they discover proof that he ordered the illegal mission in Melkøya, a warrant is issued for his arrest. He flees in the night, narrowly escaping capture, and makes his way to Poland, where he is sheltered by Ukrainian separatists. He meets a reporter from Germany's Stern magazine and leaks information damaging to Rygh. Norwegian and Polish authorities track him down and arrange his delivery in exchange for payment, but the separatists fake Berg's execution and he again escapes. He seeks refuge in Paris with his estranged wife Astrid and her new partner, a human rights lawyer named Jérôme. French police arrest Berg, but Jérôme takes his case to the European Court of Human Rights, claiming that his life would be at risk if he was extradited to Russia. The court rules in Berg's favour and orders his release.

After her mother voices her despair at the continuing violence, Rygh offers the remaining insurgents amnesty in exchange for their turning in their weapons. Vold agrees and announces the end of violent resistance, launching the Liberation Party as the peaceful political successor of Free Norway. Christensen refuses to lay down his arms, and becomes a lone wolf. He kidnaps Djupvik's daughter Andrea and demands freedom for the soldiers in exchange for her return, prompting condemnation from FOS. Andrea is rescued by Norwegian police, while Russian forces capture Christensen. They invite Djupvik to the facility where he is held. Djupvik interrogates him to find out if he was working alone, and determines that he was. Christensen taunts him, saying he regrets not killing Andrea. Djupvik then shoots and kills him.

Berg uncovers corruption in the finances of French EU commissioner Anselme, and uses his wife's influence to pressure him to help the Norwegian cause. He resigns from the commission and is replaced by a Polish politician who puts forward a motion demanding Russian withdrawal from Norway.

Minnikov discovers that Norum has been spying on him. When he confronts her, she accidentally kills him by pushing him out a window. Panicked, she calls Nikolai, who disposes of the body. The resistance find out about this and blackmail Norum, demanding she reschedule a hotel event which Sidorova and other powerful Russians will attend. After learning that Zoya has been blamed for the murder, Norum tries to turn herself in to the police, only to realise that the resistance agent works there and will not allow her to confess. She meets Djupvik and gives him information on the activities of the rebels. He informs Sidorova of the resistance's plans, which they assume to be an assassination plot against her. Nikolai overhears, and leaves Norum after realising she has been helping the resistance. She sells her share of the hotel to Nadja and seeks to emigrate to Russia with Maja. Hilde leaves Djupvik with Andrea after learning he killed Christensen.

After being released, Berg arranges a voyage by sea to return to Norway, with a group of supportive Eastern European politicians aboard to denounce the Russian intervention. However, his allies leave when Rygh's government threatens to cut off energy supplies to Europe. In response, Berg recruits FOS developer Leon to hack the Russian anti-aircraft defence system, and stages a false flag attack, using a Russian missile to shoot down a Finnish Air Force fighter jet. This causes the EU to demand an immediate Russian withdrawal from Norway; Sidorova and the Russian government agree to withdraw from Norway if Rygh remains as prime minister to guarantee cordial relations between the two countries.

Rygh pardons Faisal and the other soldiers in an attempt to rob Berg of political capital. After their release, Leon realises his actions led to the missile attack. At Frida's house, he raises his doubts about the resistance with Faisal, who states he believes they need to act against the Russian occupation. The house is then attacked by resistance soldiers, who kill Leon to ensure he cannot expose the truth about the missile strike. However, he manages to tell Frida shortly before his death. Separated from Faisal, she escapes and informs Rygh. When Berg's ship enters Norwegian waters, she orders the Navy to detain him, but they refuse. Djupvik realises the plot with Norum's hotel was a diversion, and that a coup d'état led by Vold is imminent.

With Djupvik's help, Rygh evades the Norwegian military as they begin occupying Oslo. She boards Berg's ship, where she threatens him with proof that he staged the missile attack. He agrees to implement her peace deal with Russia if he is placed in charge of the Norwegian armed forces. They spin Vold's coup as a temporary measure to maintain order during the crisis, and return to Norwegian shores together. Under orders from Berg, the military escorts Vold out of the prime minister's office, and he meets with Faisal, to whom he gives a gun. Stepping ashore at Oslo, Berg is greeted by an adoring crowd. Holding a joint speech with Rygh, he proclaims her as his official successor, and she announces the imminent end of the Russian occupation. As she is concluding her speech, she is shot by Faisal. Later that night, a distraught Berg returns to the prime minister's office, facing an uncertain future.

=== Season Three ===
After Rygh's assassination, Berg is tasked with forming a new government, and takes Grete Sundby as his new State Secretary. He reluctantly agrees to ratify the peace treaty forged between Rygh and the Russian government, which entails resuming oil and gas production to Europe. During the re-opening ceremony of the Melkøya facility, a gas explosion kills 56 people. Berg, who was attending the event, narrowly escapes unharmed. He begins working on a register of all Russians living in Norway, claiming he seeks to protect them from discrimination; however, Hilde discovers evidence that the government plans to deport all Russians in the country.

Sidorova has been removed as ambassador to Norway by the Russian government, who claim it is due to her unpopularity with the Norwegian population. However, she believes it is due to her relationship with another woman, Lyubov Sorokina. On a whim, Lyubov tells the press she believes the Melkøya explosion was a Russian attack. Fearing for their safety, Sidorova fakes a Russian assassination attempt against herself to prevent deportation to Russia.

Sundby admits to Berg that Parliament collaborated with the Russian government during the occupation, including a demand to grant Russian residents citizenship. Berg has Sidorova provide evidence for this in exchange for preventing her deportation to Russia. He convinces the Supreme Court to dissolve Parliament using powers granted by a state of emergency, scheduling elections for September. Most of the members of parliament are arrested on charges of treason and collaboration. Berg revokes the citizenships of Russian residents, forcing them to apply for residency or face deportation. He personally orders the deportation of Lyubov, hoping to force Sidorova to leave the country to be with her. Hilde helps overturn the mass deportation of Russians, allowing them to return to Norway, but Lyubov is detained at the airport in Moscow. Sidorova arranges for Lyubov to be smuggled out of Russia through Georgia; they cross the border without incident, but Lyubov undergoes an operation in Tbilisi where a small ampoule of poison is implanted in her body. Sidorova is contacted by a Russian official, who tells her that the ampoule is remote-controlled and that Lyubov will be killed if Sidorova is disloyal to Russia again.

Norum and Maja have moved to Moscow. She seeks to buy a share in a restaurant owned by businessman Igor Sobol.

In response to a border skirmish instigated by Norwegian soldiers, the EU President pressures Berg to disarm border patrols until EU peacekeeping forces withdraw. Under orders from Vold, Norwegian soldiers stage another attack against EU peacekeepers at a border post, killing several. Berg confronts Vold at the occupied post, but Vold refuses to order the soldiers to stand down. Berg negotiates their surrender. After leaving the occupied border post with Berg, Djupvik decides to attend Andrea's soccer game rather than go back to work. Shortly after Ingrid drops him off, the car explodes, killing her. Djupvik subsequently resigns from the PST.

During a presentation to the EU energy commission on Norway's oil software development, a virus crashes the system. Berg visits the headquarters of Njord, an environmental organisation run by Marie Elvestad which researches and develops renewable energy solutions. After learning that the virus was developed by a Njord engineer and cannot be removed, he agrees to promote the construction of hydroelectric dams to power Europe renewably rather than with oil. He also begin planning to convert Norway's offshore oil drilling platforms into wind power generators, and offers Elvestad the position of Climate Minister if he wins the upcoming election. At a press conference at a hydroelectric plant, a journalist tells Berg that one of the contractors, Stellux, previously trained Russian oil workers. Berg subsequently cancels the contract to avoid backlash. He seeks a scapegoat to direct negative press away from himself, and chooses Bente Norum, who is accused of profiting from the occupation through the sale of her hotel. The government freezes her assets. As a result, she is unable to buy a stake in Sobol's restaurant, and agrees to become his business advisor instead.

Sundby visits her family in London. Her son Fritjof has stock in Stellux, and she fears he may be endangered by the anti-profiteering campaign in Norway. Berg convinces him to return to Norway and denounce the company in the media. While answering questions about his financial dealings at the airport in Norway, he is splashed in the face with acid by a man involved in the "#BrandThem" movement, which seeks to punish those perceived as profiteers and collaborators with the Russian occupation. Hilde speaks out against them after being told that the police refuse to investigate attacks against Russians; she seeks police protection for a Russian trade unionist named Sokolov. While on a walk, she narrowly avoids being splashed with acid, and suffers burns to her shoulder. Djupvik becomes increasingly worried about her safety, and arranges a trip to Washington D.C., where Hilde has distant family.

Petter Bjørnstad, a former athlete turned politician, offers Hilde a position as spokeswoman for justice in his Unified Party. That night, Sokolov's home is set alight and his son is severely burned. Hilde learns that he did not have police protection despite her request. She cancels the trip to Washington, taking up Bjørnstad's offer and campaigning against violence. While campaigning, she is approached by Sokolov, who needs money to pay for his son's medical treatment. Djupvik sees a man filming them talk, and finds the footage covertly passed on to Sidorova. He breaks into her home and steals a hard drive containing encrypted emails sent between Norway and Moscow.

In the lead-up to the election, Vold's Liberation Party is leading in the polls. Berg unsuccessfully attempts to associate him with the violent #BrandThem attackers, accusing him of inciting violence in Norway. While filming a campaign video, Vold is sprayed in the face by a makeshift acid launcher. Berg realises his campaign advisor arranged the attack, but publicly blames Russia. Three months later, the acid attack has left Vold unable to speak and ended his political career. With a week remaining in the election campaign, Berg has a strong lead in the polls over Bjørnstad's Unified Party, which has become the primary opposition. Vold accuses Berg of cooperating with Russia in the acid attack.

Sidorova and Lyubov are reunited and co-found an LGBT rights organisation named Love Without Limits to campaign against homophobia. However, Sidorova secretly uses it as a front to spread Russian influence in Europe. Lyubov has an ultrasound, revealing the poison ampoule; Sidorova tells her what it is, but refuses to explain why it was inserted. She is contacted by Russian authorities, who tell her the ampoule will only be removed if she ensures Berg loses the election.

In Moscow, Sobol seeks to sway the Norwegian election in Bjørnstad's favour in order to secure a lucrative contract. Norum helps coordinate the spread of a rumour that Berg was responsible for the assassination of Anita Rygh. The PST traces it back to her; Sundby and Berg contact her, and she offers to reveal the name of her source if Berg meets her personally in Svalbard and negotiates the release of her financial assets. Sobol wants to record the meeting in order to get more material to damage Berg's chances of re-election. As Norum travels to the airport, her daughter Maja attempts suicide. Sobol arranges for both Maja and her doctors to accompany Norum to Svalbard; there, Maja tells Norum she feels lonely and neglected, and Norum says she regrets moving to Russia. At the meeting with Berg, Norum sabotages Sobol's attempt to record their conversation, and tells Berg she will provide the name of her source only if Berg helps her move Maja back to Norway. She writes a name on Maja's back and tells her only to show it to Berg. Just before they leave Svalbard, Norwegian police take Maja, claiming she has been subject to gross child neglect. Norum returns to Moscow without her. At the police station, she secretly shows Berg the name.

Maja tells Sundby about the deal between Berg and her mother. After reading the name and realising that Vold was Norum's source, Sundby visits his home and finds him dead. She calls Berg and questions him about Vold's death, but he claims to be unaware. She then resigns as state secretary and publicly denounces him. During a debate two days before the election, Bjørnstad grills Berg about Sundby's defection and Rygh's assassination. While speaking, Berg has a medical episode and collapses.

Sobol learns of Vold's death and becomes suspicious of Norum. He tortures Nikolai to convince her to confess, and arranges for her to travel to Norway and testify against Berg regarding Vold's death and Rygh's assassination. Djupvik realises that Sidorova has been collecting information to blackmail Hilde, and that she and Norum have been communicating. He confronts her at the airport after she testifies, demanding a key to access the contents of the stolen hard drive. After returning to Moscow, she sends him the key from Sobol's phone. At a dinner in Moscow, she frames Sobol for leaking the information to Djupvik, telling the Russian Deputy Prime Minister he is a spy. Sobol is killed and Norum takes over ownership of his restaurant, but Maja is still in Norway.

On election day, Berg is hounded about Rygh by the press. On the way to cast his vote, he tells his advisor he feels responsible for Rygh's death. While in the bathroom, he escapes his security detail and runs away. That night, exit polls declare Bjørnstad the winner of the election. Djupvik meets Hilde at the Unified Party function, warning her about Sidorova. He gives her tickets to Washington D.C. and distracts Sidorova, who is at the event, to give Hilde time to escape, and is taken into Russian custody. The Russian authorities tell Sidorova she must locate Hilde before the ampoule will be removed from Lyubov. Sidorova tracks and contacts Hilde, who asks to see Djupvik. Sidorova initiates a video call between them, which the Russian authorities use to track Hilde's location. Djupvik tells her to end the call, then kills himself with a bodyguard's gun. Hilde flees into hiding. Later, Lyubov gives birth, causing the ampoule to burst. The baby is healthy, but Lyubov is sent to intensive care.

A week later, Berg has been missing since election day, and Bjørnstad is sworn in as Prime Minister. Elvestad tracks Berg to his childhood home, and together they return to Njord. The group's hackers trigger a city-wide power outage in Moscow. They flee into hiding while Berg stays behind, broadcasting a message claiming the blackouts will continue daily until Russia pays compensation for its carbon emissions. He calls for a global eco-terrorist campaign against polluting governments.

== Cast and characters ==
=== Main cast ===
= Main cast (credited)
= Recurring cast (3+)
= Guest cast (1-2)

Actor	Character	Occupied Seasons		
Actor	Character	Season 1	Season 2	Season 3
Henrik Mestad	Jesper Berg	Main	Main	Main
Eldar Skar	Hans Martin Djupvik	Main	Main	Main
Ane Dahl Torp	Bente Norum	Main	Main	Main
Ragnhild Gudbrandsen	Wenche Arnesen	Main	Guest	
Vegar Hoel	Thomas Eriksen	Main		
Ingeborga Dapkūnaitė	Irina Sidorova	Main	Main	Main
Janne Heltberg	Anita Rygh	Recurring	Main	Guest
Selome Emnetu	Hilde Djupvik	Recurring	Main	Main

=== Current cast ===
==== Protagonists ====
- Henrik Mestad as Jesper Berg, the environmentalist Prime Minister of Norway, later leader of Free Norway
- Eldar Skar as Hans Martin Djupvik, a member of the Norwegian Police Security Service (PST) and Berg's bodyguard, later a Russian agent, and then chief of the PST
- Ingeborga Dapkūnaitė as Irina Sidorova, the Russian ambassador to Norway
- Ane Dahl Torp as Bente Norum, a restaurant owner, married to Thomas Eriksen
- Janne Heltberg as Anita Rygh, political advisor to Prime Minister Berg, later Prime Minister of Norway

==== Supporting characters ====
- Selome Emnetu as Hilde Djupvik, a Norwegian judge, wife of Hans Martin Djupvik
- Veslemøy Mørkrid as Ingrid Bø, a PST officer
- Stig Amdam as Lieutenant-Colonel Harald Vold, former Commander of Hans Majestet Kongens Garde, co-founder of Fritt Norge and Leader of the Liberation Party
- Lisa Loven Kongsli as Astrid Berg, Jesper Berg's wife and Project Manager of a United Nations Poverty Program in Paris
- Alexej Manvelov as Nikolai, Russian security guard and Bente's lover
- Morten Svartveit as Anders Knudsen, the Minister of Finance in Jesper Berg's Government, later interim prime minister
- Thea Green Lundberg as Frida Engø, political activist
- Kristin Skogheim as Ingvild Friis, the Minister of Justice
- Vytautas Kaniušonis as Konstantin Minikov, a powerful Russian oligarch with ties to the Kremlin
- Ragnhild Gudbrandsen as Wenche Arnesen, the chief of the PST, later member of Free Norway
- Vegar Hoel as Thomas Eriksen, an investigative journalist
- Sondre Larsen as Stefan Christensen, a member of the King's Guard, later founder of Free Norway

==== Minor characters ====
- Hippolyte Girardot as Pierre Anselme, French European Commissioner, later a lobbyist
- Krzysztof Pieczyński as Vladimir Gosev, Sidorova's intelligence officer
- Øystein Røger as Dag Ottesen, Editor-in-chief of Ny Tid
- Morten Traavik as General Jacob Istad, Norway's Chief of Defence and a member of the Free Norway
- Ville Virtanen as Antti Korhonen, President of the Republic of Finland
- Filip Peeters as Rudolf Teichmann, President of the European Union
- Mads Sjøgård Pettersen as Petter Bjørnstad

== Episodes ==
=== Season 1 (2015) ===
No. overall	No. in season	Title	Directed by	Written by	Original release date	Norwegian viewers (millions)
1	1	"April"	Erik Skjoldbjærg	Karianne Lund, Erik Richter Strand, & Erik Skjoldbjærg	4 October 2015	0.663
2	2	"May"	Erik Skjoldbjærg	Karianne Lund, Erik Richter Strand, & Erik Skjoldbjærg	11 October 2015	0.556
3	3	"June"	Erik Richter Strand	Karianne Lund, Erik Richter Strand, & Erik Skjoldbjærg	18 October 2015	0.414
4	4	"July"	Erik Richter Strand	Karianne Lund, Erik Richter Strand, & Ina Bruhn	25 October 2015	0.378
5	5	"August"	Pål Sletaune	Karianne Lund, Erik Skjoldbjærg, & Björn Paqualin	1 November 2015	0.381
6	6	"September"	Pål Sletaune	Karianne Lund & Erik Skjoldbjærg	8 November 2015	0.422
7	7	"October"	Eva Sørhaug	Karianne Lund, Tomas Solli, & Erik Skjoldbjærg	15 November 2015	0.285
8	8	"November"	Eva Sørhaug	Karianne Lund, Tomas Solli, & Erik Skjoldbjærg	22 November 2015	N/A
9	9	"December"	John Andreas Andersen	Karianne Lund, Tomas Solli, Erik Skjoldbjærg, & Björn Paqualin	29 November 2015	N/A
10	10	"December — Part 2"	John Andreas Andersen	Karianne Lund, Tomas Solli, Erik Skjoldbjærg, & Björn Paqualin	6 December 2015	0.470

=== Season 2 (2017) ===
No. overall	No. in season	Title	Directed by	Written by	Original release date	Norwegian viewers (millions)
11	1	"August"	Erik Skjoldbjærg	Karianne Lund, Ståle Stein Berg, & Erik Skjoldbjærg	29 September 2017	N/A
12	2	"September"	Erik Skjoldbjærg	Karianne Lund, Ståle Stein Berg, & Erik Skjoldbjærg	6 October 2017	N/A
13	3	"October"	Erik Skjoldbjærg	Karianne Lund, Ståle Stein Berg, & Erik Skjoldbjærg	13 October 2017	N/A
14	4	"November"	Jens Lien	Karianne Lund, Ståle Stein Berg, & Erik Skjoldbjærg	20 October 2017	N/A
15	5	"December"	Jens Lien	Karianne Lund, Ståle Stein Berg, & Erik Skjoldbjærg	27 October 2017	N/A
16	6	"January"	Jens Lien	Karianne Lund, Ståle Stein Berg, & Erik Skjoldbjærg	3 November 2017	N/A
17	7	"February — Part 1"	Charlotte Brändström	Karianne Lund, Ståle Stein Berg, & Erik Skjoldbjærg	10 November 2017	N/A
18	8	"February — Part 2"	Charlotte Brändström	Karianne Lund, Ståle Stein Berg, & Erik Skjoldbjærg	17 November 2017	N/A

=== Season 3 (2019) ===
No. overall	No. in season	Title	Directed by	Written by	Original release date	Norwegian viewers (millions)
19	1	"March"	Erik Skjoldbjærg & Karianne Lund	Erik Skjoldbjærg, Hilde Susan Jaegtnes, & Camilla Strøm Henriksen	5 December 2019	N/A
20	2	"April"	Camilla Strøm Henriksen, Erik Skjoldbjærg, & Gunnar Vikene	Karianne Lund, Hilde Susan Jaegtnes, & Erik Skjoldbjærg	5 December 2019	N/A
21	3	"May"	Camilla Strøm Henriksen, Erik Skjoldbjærg, & Gunnar Vikene	Karianne Lund, Ståle Stein Berg, Camilla Strøm Henriksen, & Erik Skjoldbjærg	12 December 2019	N/A
22	4	"June"	Camilla Strøm Henriksen, Erik Skjoldbjærg, & Gunnar Vikene	Karianne Lund, Hilde Susan Jaegtnes, Erik Skjoldbjærg, & Camilla Strøm Henriksen	19 December 2019	N/A
23	5	"September — Part 1"	Camilla Strøm Henriksen, Erik Skjoldbjærg, & Gunnar Vikene	Camilla Strøm Henriksen, Hilde Susan Jaegtnes, & Erik Skjoldbjærg	26 December 2019	N/A
24	6	"September — Part 2"	Camilla Strøm Henriksen, Erik Skjoldbjærg, & Gunnar Vikene	Camilla Strøm Henriksen, Hilde Susan Jaegtnes, & Erik Skjoldbjærg	2 January 2020	N/A

== Production ==
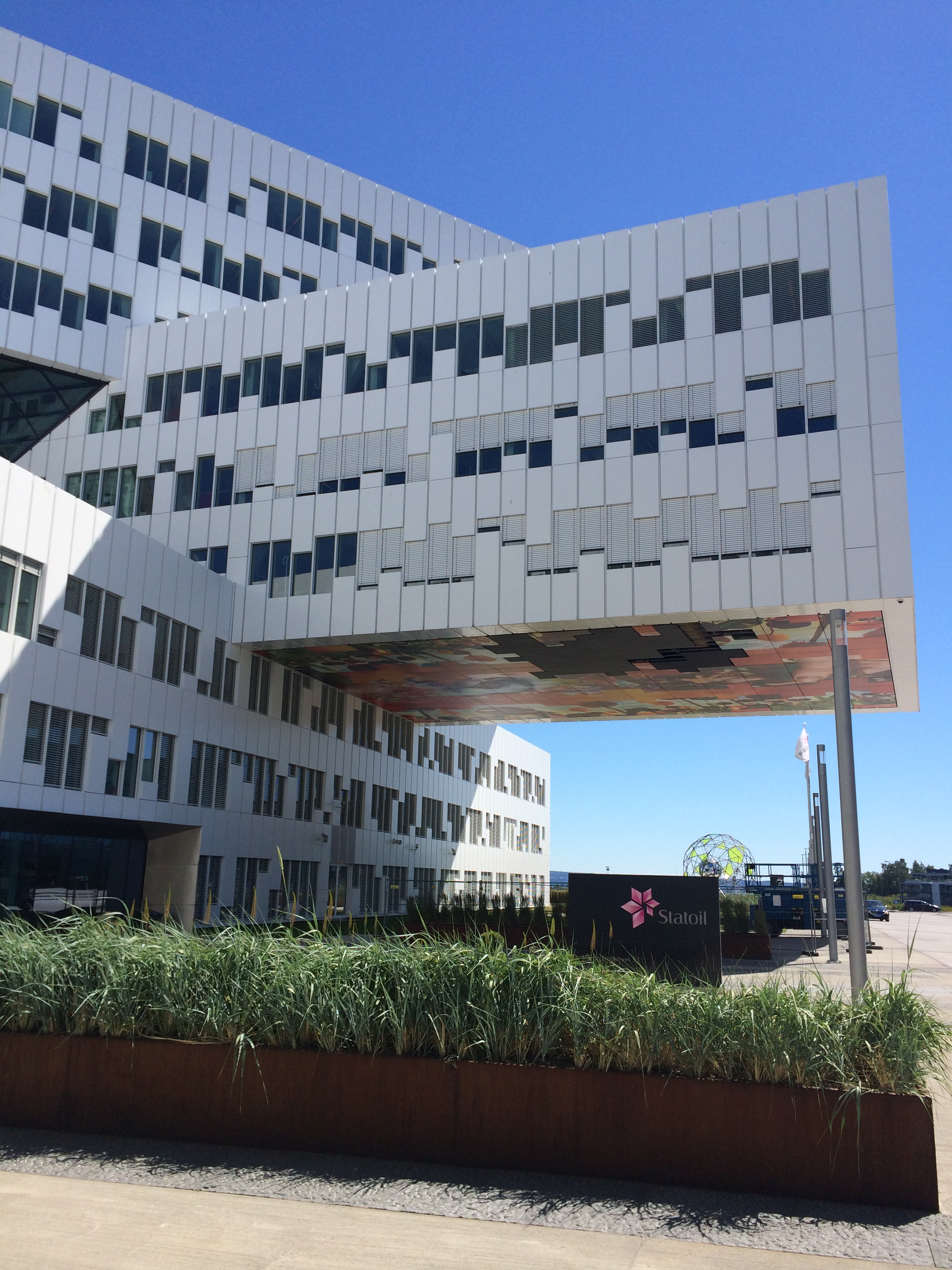
The offices of energy company Statoil served as the fictional office of the Prime Minister

Jo Nesbø wrote the first episodes in 2008, and the series, planned to be produced for Norwegian Broadcasting Corporation (NRK), received a NOK 9.7 million production grant from the Norwegian Film Institute in April 2013. After four years of planning, disagreements over the progress led NRK to withdraw from the project; TV2 took over in October 2013.

Erik Skjoldbjærg told NPR's Ari Shapiro that "any kind of good fiction feeds off the reality of some situation. In fact we were looking at a number of different conflicts. One was the invasion of Iraq in 2003."

== Release ==
=== Broadcast ===
The series premiered in Norway on TV2 on 5 October 2015, and in the United Kingdom and Ireland on 13 January 2016 on Sky Arts in HD. The series was added to the Netflix streaming service, in multiple countries, as of 20 January 2016. The series premiered on Pivot TV in the United States on 5 May 2016 and on the Canadian public television stations TVOntario and Knowledge Network. TVOntario premiered the show on 11 September 2016 and Knowledge Network broadcast the show beginning 26 June 2020. In Poland, the series broadcasts on Ale Kino+.

=== Home media ===
Season	Episodes	Originally aired			DVD and Blu-ray release dates			Netflix release dates (US)
Season	Episodes	First aired	Last aired	Timeslot (CET)	Region 1	Region 2	Region 4	Netflix release dates (US)
1	10	4 October 2015	6 December 2015	Sunday	TBA	14 December 2015	TBA	15 January 2016
2	8	29 September 2017	17 November 2017	Friday	TBA	TBA	TBA	16 March 2018
3	6	5 December 2019	2 January 2020	Thursday	TBA	TBA	TBA	31 December 2019

== Reception ==
The Daily Telegraph's cultural reviewer Gerard O'Donovan wrote of Occupied that the series' innovation more than made up for any lack of plausibility, citing the interesting historical, geopolitical interplay between Norway and Russia as fascinating. O'Donovan went on to praise the first episode, saying, "the tense plotting and a pace sufficiently frenetic to carry all but the most curmudgeonly along."

Vyacheslav Pavlovsky, the Russian ambassador to Norway, told Russian News Agency TASS, "It is certainly a shame that, in the year of the 70th anniversary of the victory in World War II, the authors have seemingly forgotten the Soviet Army's heroic contribution to the liberation of northern Norway from Nazi occupiers, decided, in the worst traditions of the Cold War, to scare Norwegian spectators with the nonexistent threat from the east." The Russian embassy had been informed in an early stage of the work on the series.

The circumstances depicted in Occupied have been compared to Russia's invasion and annexation of Crimea in 2014 and more recently to the Russian threats toward Ukraine before the 2022 war.

Occupied also casts the integrity of Green politicians in a bad light, and portrays the European Union commissioners as devious and hypocritical.

== See also ==
- A Very British Coup, a 1982 novel in which a left-wing British government is overthrown by the security services
  - A Very British Coup, a 1988 television miniseries adapted from the novel
- Main Intelligence Directorate (GRU), the foreign military intelligence agency of the Russian Federation
- Northern Fleet, the unit of the Russian Navy responsible for the defence of northwestern Russia
- Norwegian Armed Forces
