= Kjersti Holmen =

Norwegian actress (1956–2021)

- Born: 8 February 1956; Nøtterøy Municipality, Norway
- Died: 26 September 2021 (aged 65)
- Occupation: Actress

Kjersti Holmen (8 February 1956 – 26 September 2021) was a Norwegian actress.

She was born in Nøtterøy Municipality, and later moved to Alnabru, where she grew up with her parents and two sisters. She graduated from the Norwegian National Academy of Theatre in 1980, and was employed at the National Theatre since 1981 – permanently since 1992. There she had roles such as "Eliza Doolittle" in George Bernard Shaw's Pygmalion, the title role in Henrik Ibsen's Hedda Gabler and "Blanche" in Tennessee Williams' A Streetcar Named Desire.

Holmen was also a well-known television and film actress, and had her break-through on the big screen in the 1985 film Orions belte. She won the Amanda – the main Norwegian film award – twice: in 1993 for her role in Telegrafisten, and in 2000 for the two films S.O.S. and Sophie's World. In television she was known from the Norwegian/Swedish collaboration "Röd snö" – aired the same year as Orions belte came out – as well as several other roles.

Holmen lived with actor Sverre Anker Ousdal, and had two sons from a previous relationship with actor Reidar Sørensen.

Holmen died at Økernhjemmet on 26 September 2021, after a long illness.

== Select filmography ==
- Orions belte (1985)
- Röd snö (TV, 1985)
- Den Spanske flue (TV, 1990)
- Herman (1990)
- Telegrafisten (1993)
- Ti kniver i hjertet (1994)
- Jakten på nyresteinen (1996)
- Gåten Knut Hamsun (1996)
- 1732 Høtten (1998)
- Sofies verden (1999)
- S.O.S. (1999)
- Kvinnen i mitt liv (2003)
- Marichen Altenburg in An Immortal Man (2006)
- Max Manus (2008)
- Upperdog (2009)
- A Somewhat Gentle Man (2010)
