= King's School station =

Light rail network in Bethel Park, Pennsylvania, U.S.

King's School
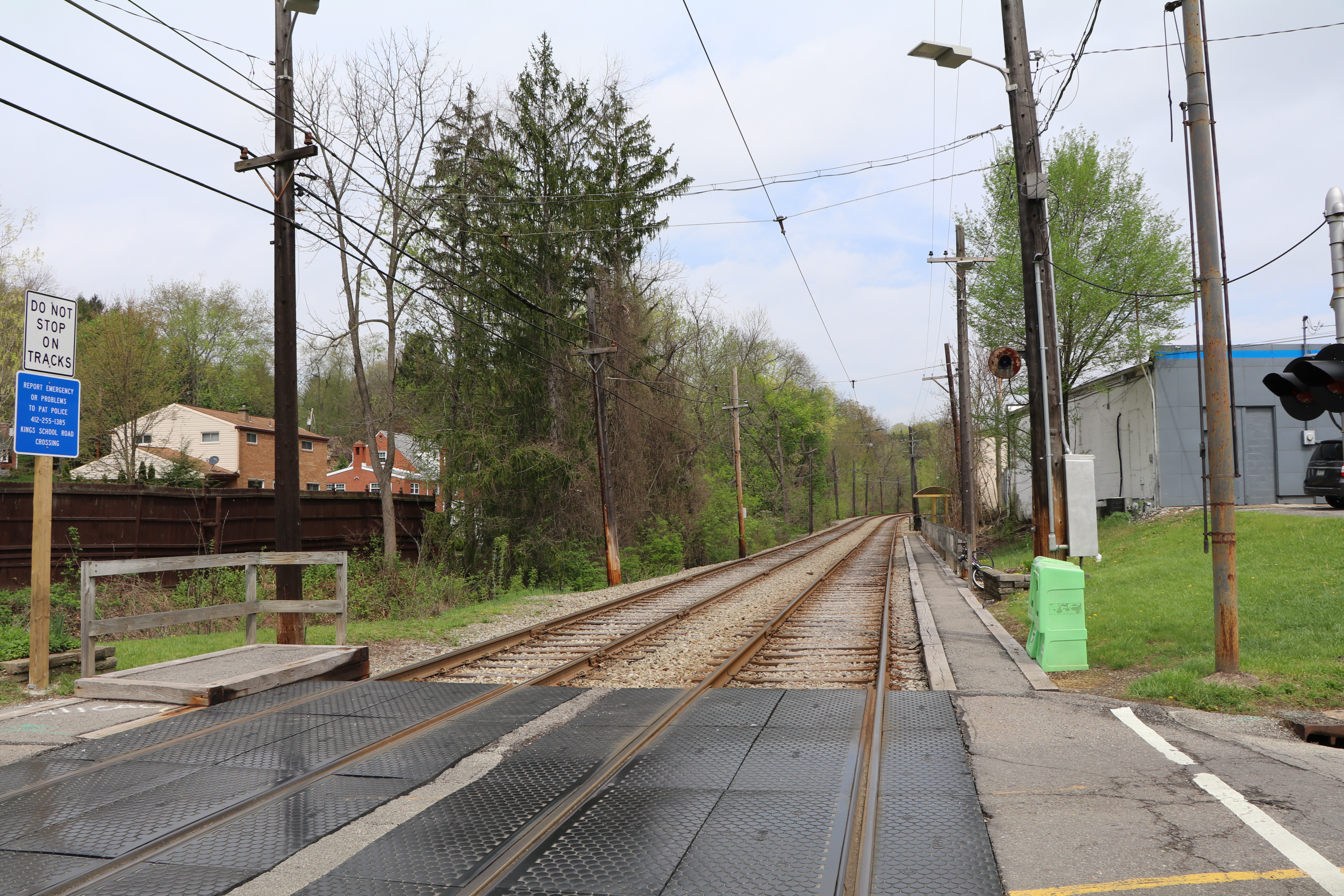
- Looking north

General information
- Location: Library Road at King's School Road; Bethel Park, Pennsylvania
- Coordinates: 40.3080°N 80.0332°W
- Owner: Pittsburgh Regional Transit
- Line: Library Line
- Platforms: 2 side platforms
- Tracks: 2

Construction
- Structure type: At-grade
- Accessible: No

History
- Opened: 1903

Passengers
- 2018: 50 (weekday boardings)

Services
Preceding station	Pittsburgh Regional Transit	Following station
Logan toward Allegheny	Silver Line	Beagle toward Library
Location

King's School station is a stop on the Pittsburgh Light Rail network, operated by Pittsburgh Regional Transit, serving Bethel Park, Pennsylvania. It is a small, street-level stop used by local residents traveling to and from Downtown Pittsburgh. The station consists of two low-level side platforms for street-level boarding and is not accessible.

== History ==
A stop was established at Kings School when the Pittsburgh Railways interurban line from Charleroi to Pittsburgh was opened through Bethel Park on September 12, 1903. Passengers initially changed at Castle Shannon to continue their journey to Downtown via the Pittsburgh and Castle Shannon Railroad. It was cut back to Library in 1953 and was converted from PCC operation to Light Rail in 1988.
