= South Park station (Pittsburgh) =

South Park
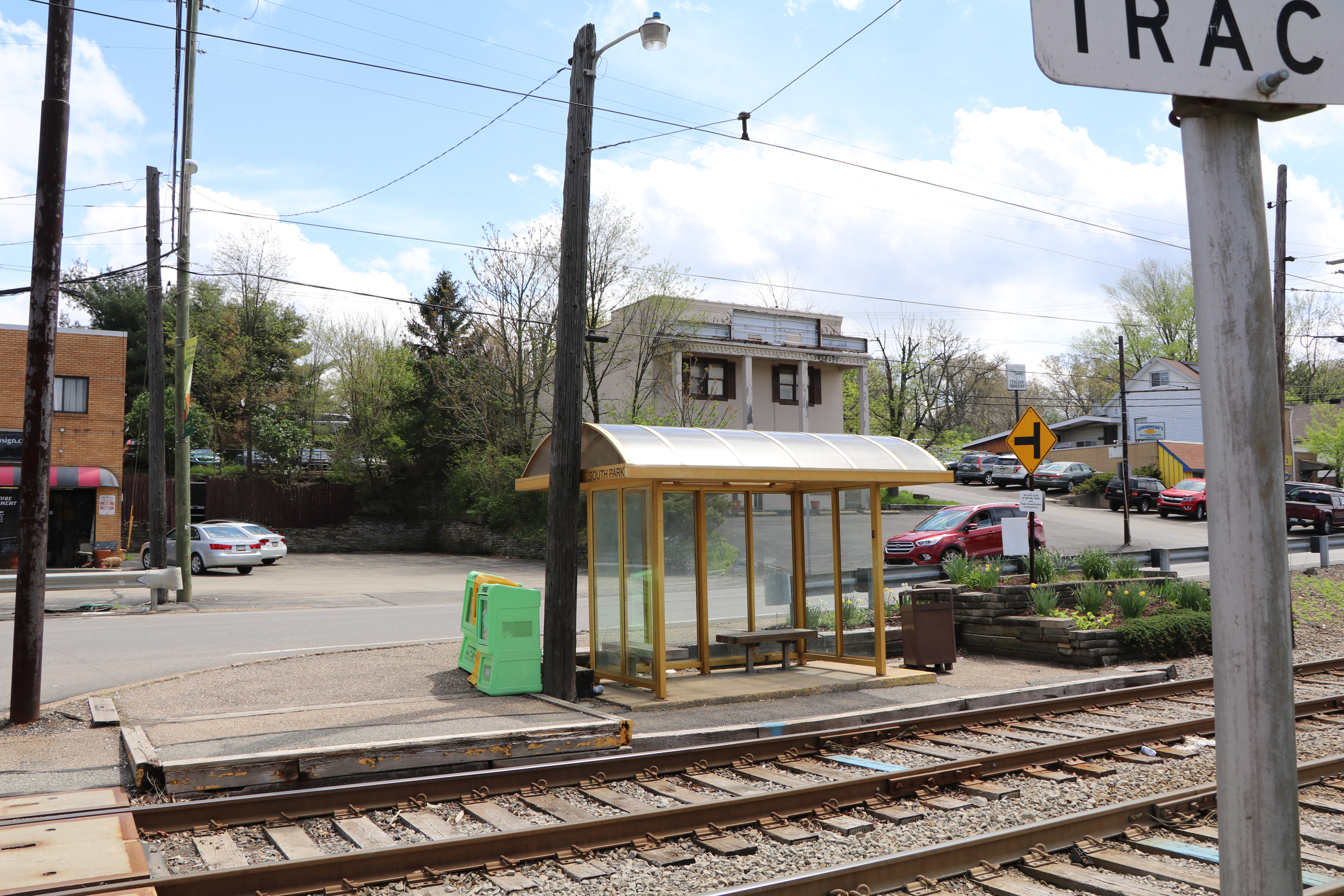
- The inbound platform

General information
- Location: Brightwood Road at South Park Road; Bethel Park, Pennsylvania
- Coordinates: 40.3280°N 80.0305°W
- Owner: Pittsburgh Regional Transit
- Line: Library Line
- Platforms: 2 side platforms
- Tracks: 2

Construction
- Structure type: At-grade
- Accessible: No

History
- Rebuilt: 1987

Passengers
- 2018: 148 (weekday boardings)

Services
Preceding station	Pittsburgh Regional Transit	Following station
Mesta toward Allegheny	Silver Line	Munroe toward Library
Location

South Park station is a stop on the Pittsburgh Light Rail network, operated by Pittsburgh Regional Transit, serving Bethel Park, Pennsylvania. It is a small, street-level stop used by local residents traveling to and from Downtown Pittsburgh. The station consists of two low-level side platforms for street-level boarding and is not accessible.

== History ==
A rebuilt PAT PCC streetcar, No. 4007 is on display in front of the Schoolhouse Arts Center, 100 yards (91 m) east of the station. This trolley operated on the route before it was converted to Light Rail operation. The rebuild car number has been removed at the request of a local family as this vehicle was involved in a fatal accident whilst operating on the 47 Drake route. However, it was later given the number 1729 (thought to be its original number), but this was later found to be in error and at some point the car may be renumbered to its actual original number of 1719.
