= Thomas Robsahm =

Norwegian film producer and director (born 1964)

- Born: 29 April 1964 (age 62); Arendal, Norway
- Occupations: Film producer and director
- Parents: Ugo Tognazzi (father); Margarete Robsahm (mother)
- Relatives: Fred Robsahm (uncle); Ricky Tognazzi (half-brother); Gianmarco Tognazzi (half-brother); Maria Sole Tognazzi (half-sister)
- Awards: Amanda Award (1999); Nordic Council Film Prize (2016)

Thomas Robsahm (born 29 April 1964) is a Norwegian film producer and director.

== Personal life ==
Born in Arendal on 29 April 1964, Robsahm is the son of actors Ugo Tognazzi and Margarete Robsahm, and is married to screenwriter and actress Silje Holtet.

== Career ==
Robsahm has produced a large number of films, documentaries and short films, including "The Worst Person in the World", "Loveable", "Hope", "The Angel" and "Dancing Queen". Films he has directed include "a-ha The Movie", the drama Svarte pantere (1992), Myggen (1996), a documentary about Norwegian footballer Erik Mykland. His 1999 comedy S.O.S. was awarded the Amanda Award for best Norwegian film.

In 2009 he produced Angel, directed by Margreth Olin. He produced three films directed by Joachim Trier; Louder Than Bombs in 2015, Thelma in 2017, and The Worst Person in the World in 2021.

He was awarded the Nordic Council Film Prize in 2016 for Louder than bombs, along with director Joachim Trier and scriptwriter Eskil Vogt.

He was awarded the Aamot Statuette in 2021, along with Aslaug Holm.
