= Viking Mestad =

Norwegian banker and politician

Viking Mestad (12 January 1930 – 15 December 2013) was a Norwegian banker and politician for the Liberal Party.

He took the cand.jur. degree in 1955, and was hired in the Bank of Norway in 1962. In 1986 he was promoted from the position as head of the administration department to become director of the secretariat of the board (Hovedstyresekretariatet). He remained in the Bank of Norway until his retirement in 1995. In 2002 he issued the study Frå fot til feste - norsk valutarett og valutapolitikk 1873-2001.

From 1972 to 1973 he served as a State Secretary in the Ministry of Government Administration and Consumer Affairs as a part of Korvald's Cabinet. He was also a member of Oslo city council in the early 1970s.

Mestad was a proponent of the Nynorsk written form of Norwegian. From 1977 to 1997 he was the chair of the theatre Det Norske Teatret. He was succeeded by Berge Furre. Two months after retiring, Mestad was proclaimed an honorary member of the employers' association Association of Norwegian Theatres and Orchestras. At the same time he also received the Hedda Award.

He is the father of actor Henrik Mestad and Viking Mestad died in December 2013.
