= Henrik Mestad =

Norwegian actor (born 1964)

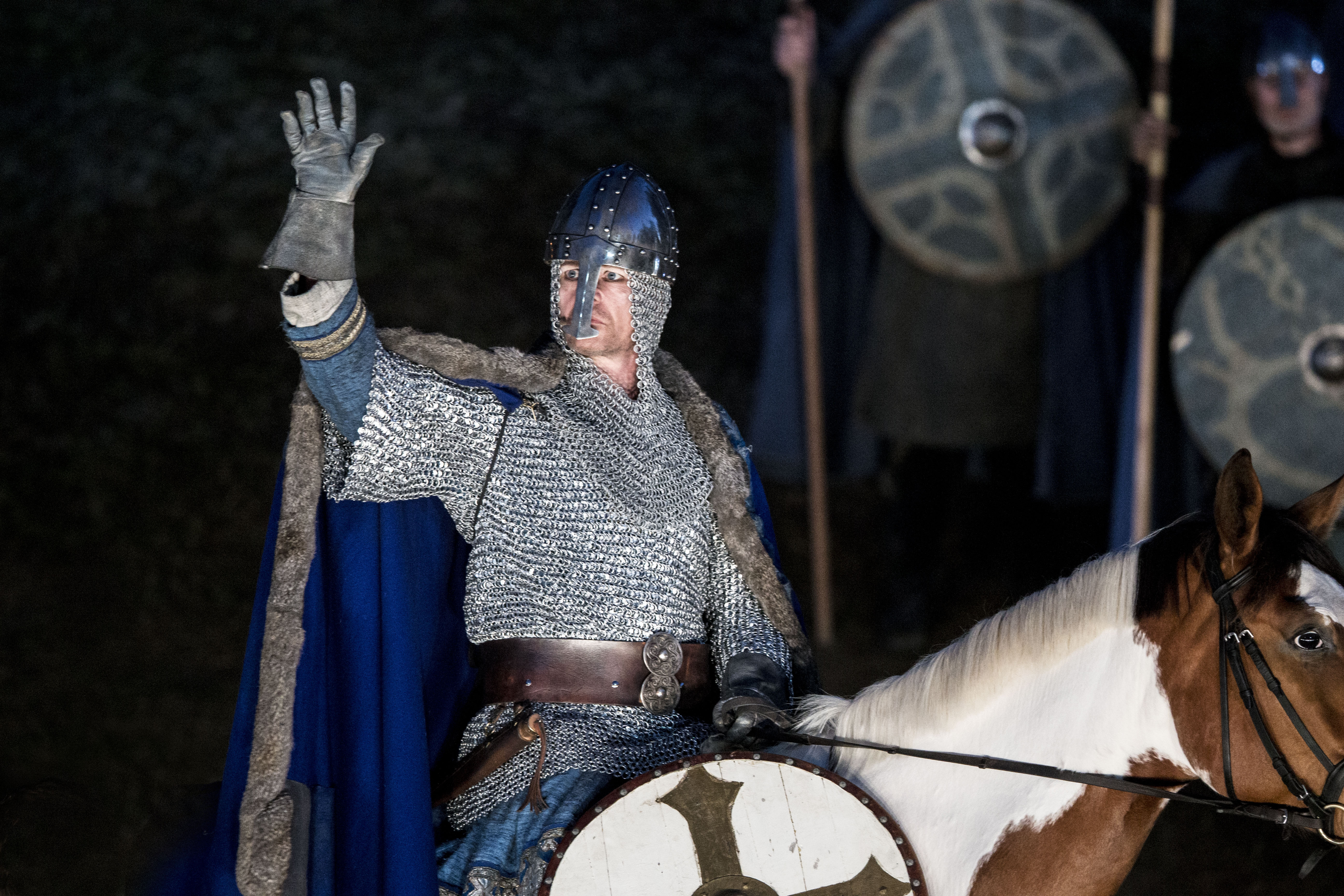
- Mestad as King Olaf II of Norway in The Saint Olav Drama at Stiklestad, 2013.
- Born: 22 June 1964 (age 61); Oslo, Norway
- Occupation: Actor

Henrik Mestad (born 22 June 1964) is a Norwegian stage, film, and television actor. He is known for his role as the Norwegian prime minister in the political thriller Occupied, and as Viking chieftain Olav in Norseman.

== Early life and education ==
Mestad was born on 22 June 1964 in Oslo, son of the politician Viking Mestad.

He was educated at the Norwegian Theatre Academy and was hired at Nationaltheatret in 1991.

== Career ==
As a dramatist, Mestad penned and starred in the plays Lik meg når jeg er teit (1993) and Nansens sønn (2002), both of which played at Nationaltheatret.

On the screen, he has starred in Svarte pantere (1992), Vestavind (TV series, 1994–95), Sons (2006), The Art of Negative Thinking and Tatt av kvinnen (2007). In 2013-2014, he co-starred in seasons two and three of the Netflix original series Lilyhammer. From 2015 to 2020, he portrayed the Norwegian Prime Minister, Jesper Berg, in the political thriller Occupied. He played the Viking Chieftain Olav in seasons one and three of the Netflix original series Norseman in 2017 and 2020 respectively.

== Awards ==
He received the Hedda Award in 2011.
