= Latimer station (PAAC) =

Latimer
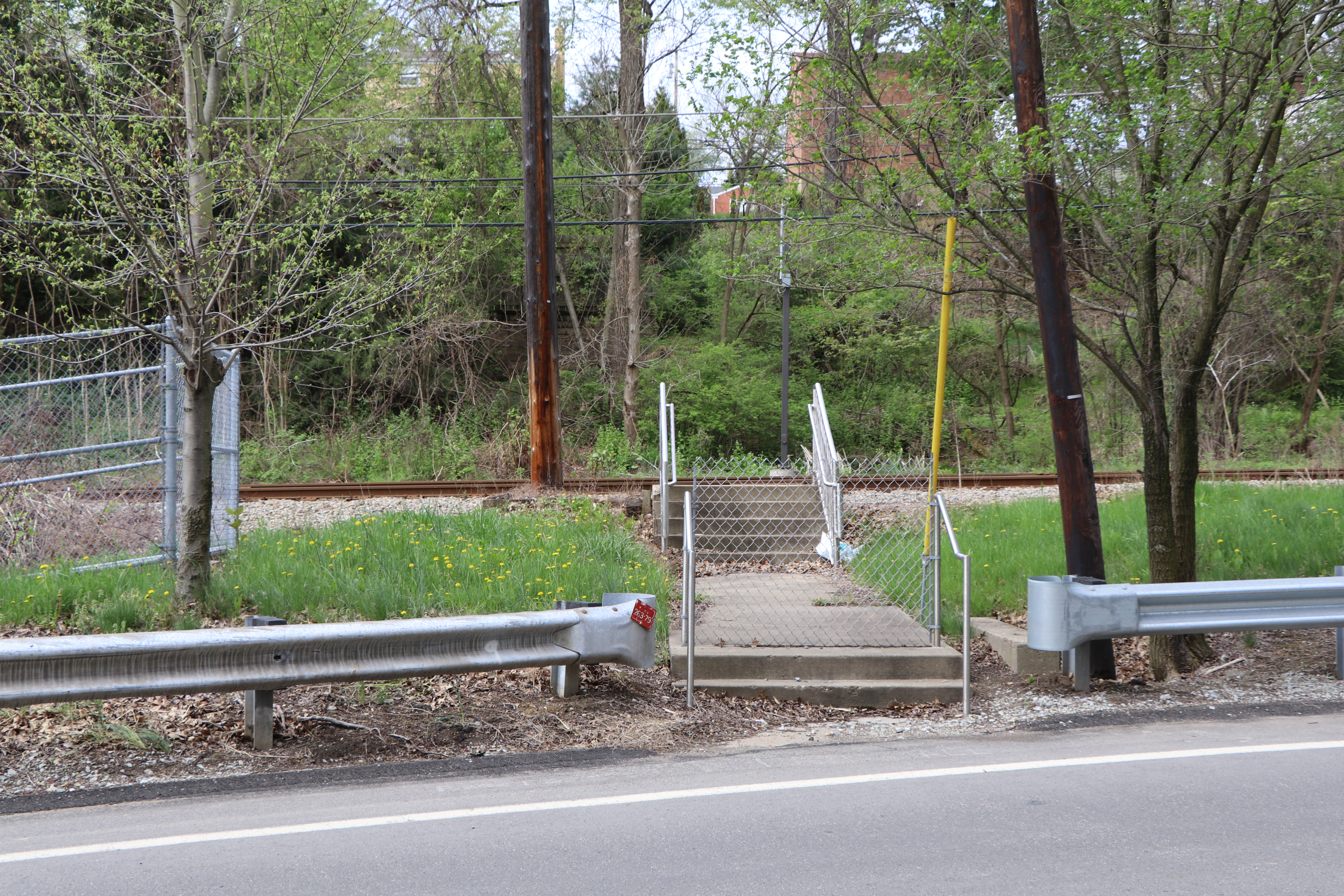
- Station site in 2017. This staircase used to lead to the inbound platform.

General information
- Location: Library Road at Brightwood Road, Bethel Park, Pennsylvania
- Coordinates: 40.3189°N 80.0284°W
- Owner: Port Authority
- Tracks: 2

Construction
- Structure type: street level

History
- Closed: June 25, 2012
- Rebuilt: –May 22, 1987

Former services
Preceding station	Port Authority of Allegheny County	Following station
Munroe toward Allegheny	Blue Line Library	Sarah toward Library
Location

Latimer was a station on the Port Authority of Allegheny County's light rail network, located in Bethel Park, Pennsylvania. The street level stop was designed as a small commuter stop, serving area residents who walked to the train so they could be taken toward Downtown Pittsburgh.

Latimer was one of eleven stops closed on June 25, 2012, as part of a system-wide consolidation effort.
