= Guro Sibeko =

Norwegian writer (born 1975)

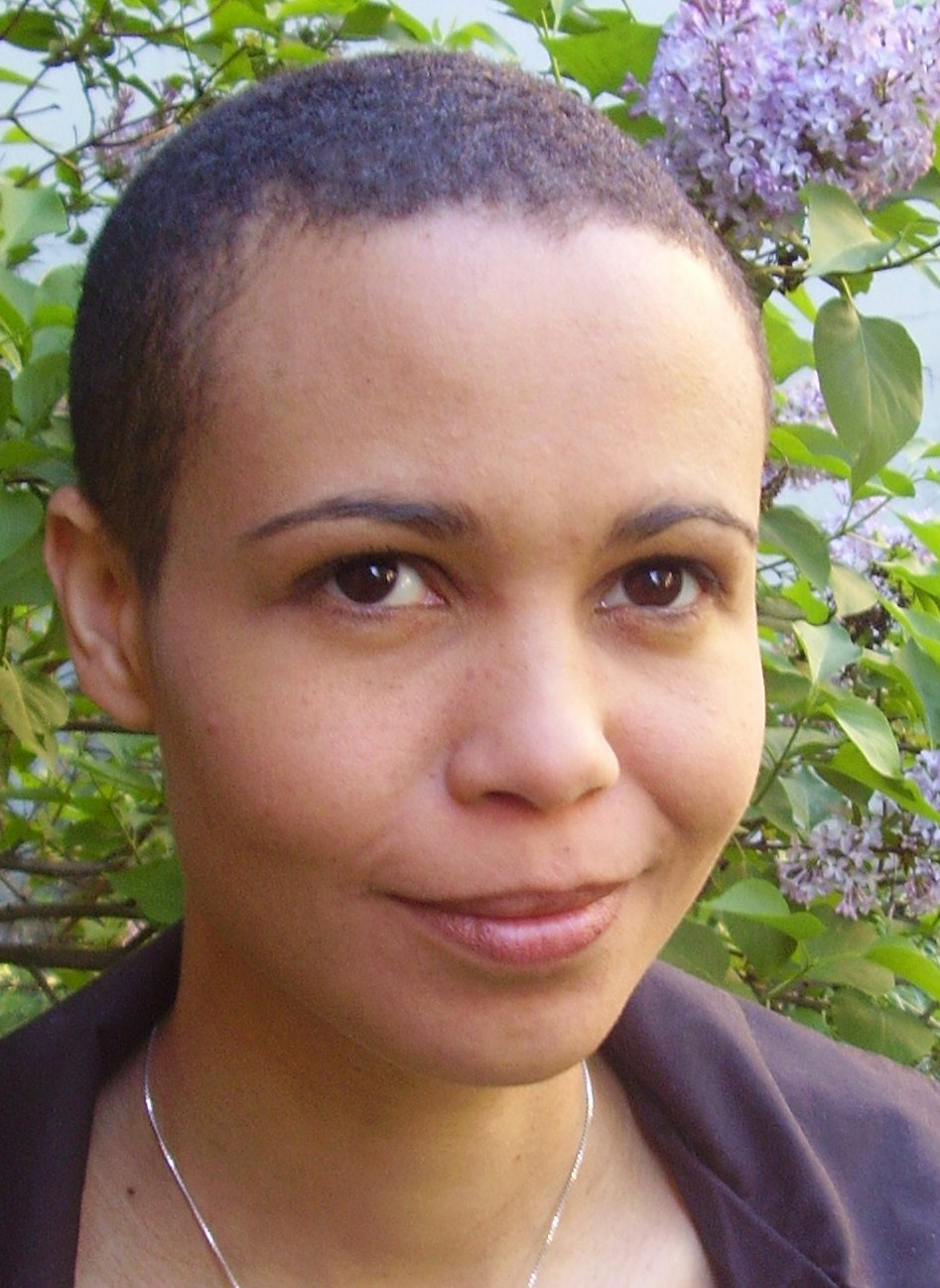
Guro Sibeko, 2018.

Guro Jabulisile Sibeko (born 22 June 1975) is a Norwegian novelist, non-fiction writer and activist.

She was born to a Norwegian mother and South African father, a refugee from apartheid regime who had also fallen out with the ANC. She grew up in Rælingen, until joining the Blitz movement and becoming a squatter as a teenager.

Educated in Nordic languages and literature at the University of Oslo, she has issued the novels Vingespenn (Gyldendal, 2009), Ctrl + Alt + Delete (Gyldendal, 2010) and Jeg kan oppløse mørket (Juritzen, 2013) and the children's books Blodmånenatta (Cappelen Damm, 2011) and Ildulven (Cappelen Damm, 2012). She followed with a biography on her father Krigerhjerte (2013) and an anti-racist book Rasismens poetikk (2019).

Openly lesbian, she has been deputy leader of the National Association for Lesbians, Gays, Bisexuals and Transgender People. In 2020 she was one of the signatories of the "Call for Inclusive Feminism," a document which led to the establishment of the Initiative for Inclusive Feminism.
