= Karosa ŠM 16,5 =

Prototype of a Czech articulated urban bus

Overview
- Manufacturer: Karosa
- Production: 1966-1969
- Assembly: Czechoslovakia: Vysoké Mýto

Body and chassis
- Class: Articulated bus
- Layout: Puller layout: underfloor mid-engine, center-axle drive
- Doors: 4, 2x three-leaf + 2x four-leaf pneumatic folding doors
- Floor type: High-floor
- Chassis: Unibody self-supporting modular panel frame

Powertrain
- Engine: 11.2 L (11,150 cc) Škoda ML 630 I6 diesel
- Power output: 132.4 kW (180.0 PS; 177.6 hp)
- Transmission: Praga 2M70 2-speed automatic

Dimensions
- Length: 16,500 to 16,600 mm (649.6 to 653.5 in)
- Width: 2,500 mm (98.4 in)
- Height: 2,955 to 2,985 mm (116.3 to 117.5 in)
- Curb weight: 10,920 to 11,800 kg (24,070 to 26,010 lb)

Chronology
- Predecessor: Škoda 706 RTO-K
- Successor: Karosa B 741

Karosa ŠM 16,5 (Škoda městský, lit. 'Škoda urban' 16.5m) was a limited-production articulated urban bus built by state bus manufacturer Karosa Vysoké Mýto in Czechoslovakia between 1966 and 1969. Only 15 (along with one prototype) were ever produced. Karosa did not produce a successor until the Karosa B 741 in 1991, due to the Ikarus 280 fulfilling the demand for articulated buses in Czechoslovakia.

== Construction features ==
The Karosa ŠM 16,5 was completely different from its predecessor, the Škoda 706 RTO-K, which was front-engined and had a body-on-frame construction. The ŠM 16,5 was part of the Karosa Š series. Structurally, it was derived from the Karosa ŠM 11 city bus. The front section was nearly identical to the ŠM 11, and the rear articulated section was based on a modified variant of the same design. The body was a self-supporting unibody of modular panel construction, one of the first of such designs in Czechoslovakia. The lower side panels were made of corrugated sheet metal siding. The engine and automatic gearbox were located between the front and the driven middle axle under the floor, giving it an underfloor mid-engine puller layout. The suspension was pneumatic, with the front axle independent, and the middle and rear axles solid, as was the case in the ŠM 11. Due to the length of the bus, the rear axle was made steerable. On the right side were four pneumatic folding doors (front and rear were three-leaf, middle were four-leaf). The bus could carry 150 passengers (50 seated + 100 standing at 8 passengers/m²). Unusually, two of these seats were located in the articulation turntable, and most of the passenger compartment utilized a 2+2 seating layout. In the area near the rear door, there was an additional seat/station for the conductor, who communicated with the driver via intercom, along with space for prams and luggage. A glass partition partially separated the driver's cab from the passenger compartment.

== Production and operation ==
The first prototype was built in 1966, and began service in Prague in the winter of 1967 on line 134. It was subsequently sold to DPMP Pardubice the next year, where it operated until 1984. After some design changes and improvements, 15 more were produced as a pre-production batch of evaluation vehicles for further testing by transit companies, before mass production could commence. These pre-production vehicles operated in Brno, Bratislava, České Budějovice, Ústí nad Labem, and Nitra. They were regarded as reliable; however, no more were produced because of a decision to import Ikarus 280 buses instead. This was due to capacity limits at the Vysoké Mýto factory, the lack of interest from DPP Prague (one of the main customers of Karosa) in the model, and because Comecon had assigned articulated bus manufacturing to Hungary. The last ŠM 16,5 buses were withdrawn in the early 1980s.

== Historical vehicles ==
No ŠM 16,5 bus has been preserved. A replica is being built in Slovakia since 2012, however, as of August 2026, its status is unknown.

== See also ==
- List of buses
