= Palmovka (Prague Metro) =

Prague metro station

Coordinates: 50°06′14″N 14°28′30″E

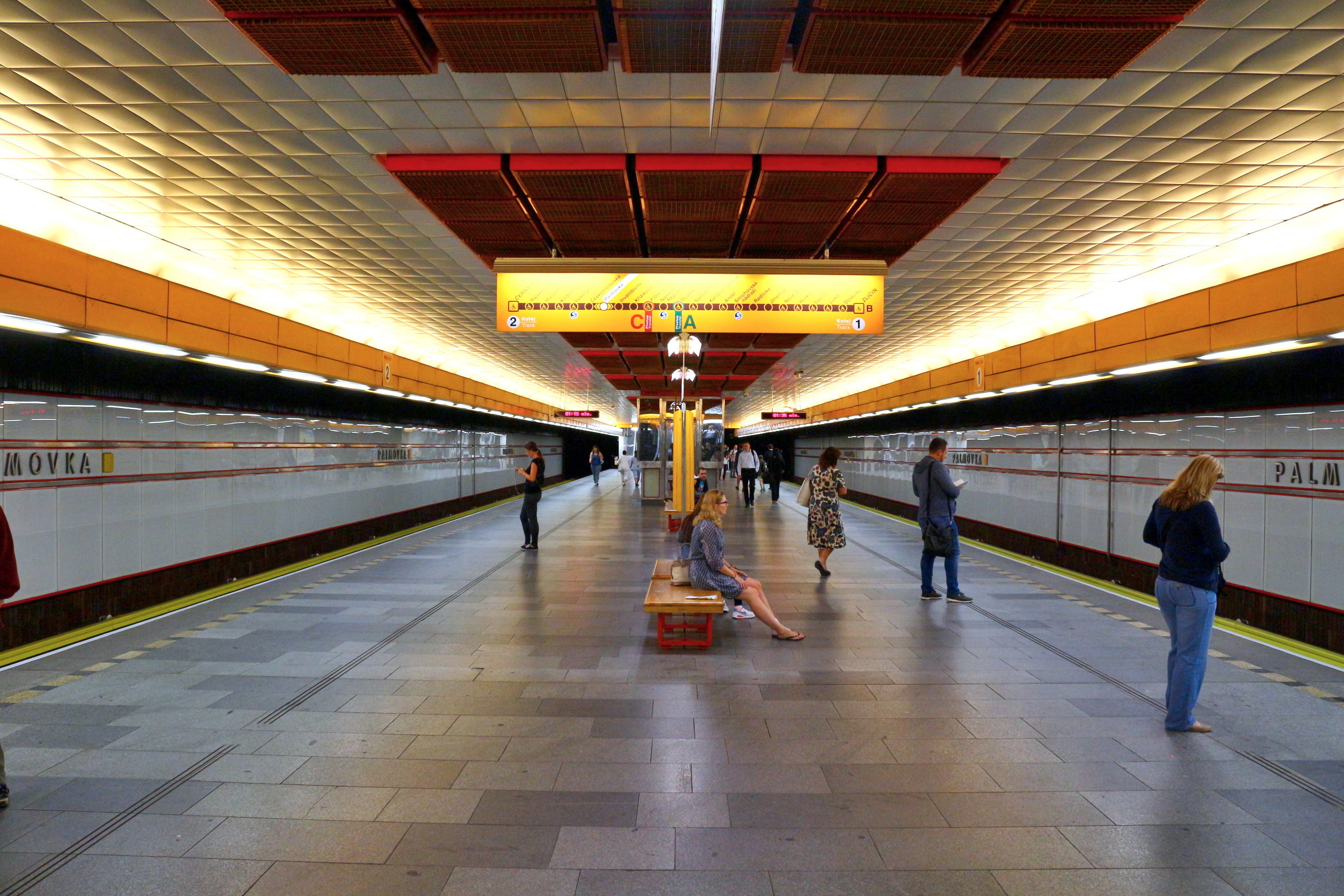

General information
- Location: Na Žertvách street Libeň, Prague 8 Prague; Czech Republic
- System: Prague Metro
- Platforms: 1 island platform
- Tracks: 2
- Connections: Tram 3,7,8,10,12,24,31; (Trolley)bus: X25,58,109; Night transit: 92,94,95,X94,903

Construction
- Structure type: Underground
- Depth: 124 m (407 ft)
- Accessible: Yes

Other information
- Fare zone: PID: Prague

History
- Opened: 22 November 1990; 35 years ago

Services
Preceding station	Prague Metro	Following station
Invalidovna toward Zličín	Line B	Českomoravská toward Černý Most
Location

Palmovka (Czech pronunciation: [ˈpalmofka]) is a Prague Metro station on Line B and also a neighborhood and a street in Libeň (Prague 8). The western metro entrance connects the station with the tram lines and trolleybus lines; the eastern one connects the station to a bus terminal.

The station was opened on 22 November 1990 as part of the extension from Florenc to Českomoravská. The station was dug by a cut-and-cover method. The station is 203 metres (666 ft) long and its platform is 10 metres (33 ft) wide, without columns. Both ends of the platform have escalators connecting users with the vestibules. Step-free access for the station was completed in November 2017, through the installation of two passenger lifts connecting the western metro station entrance with the station platform.

The name of the station and adjacent neighbourhood derives from the Palm's homestead, from the family name of the 18th-century owners of the homestead, which have already disappeared under the new development.

== Gallery ==
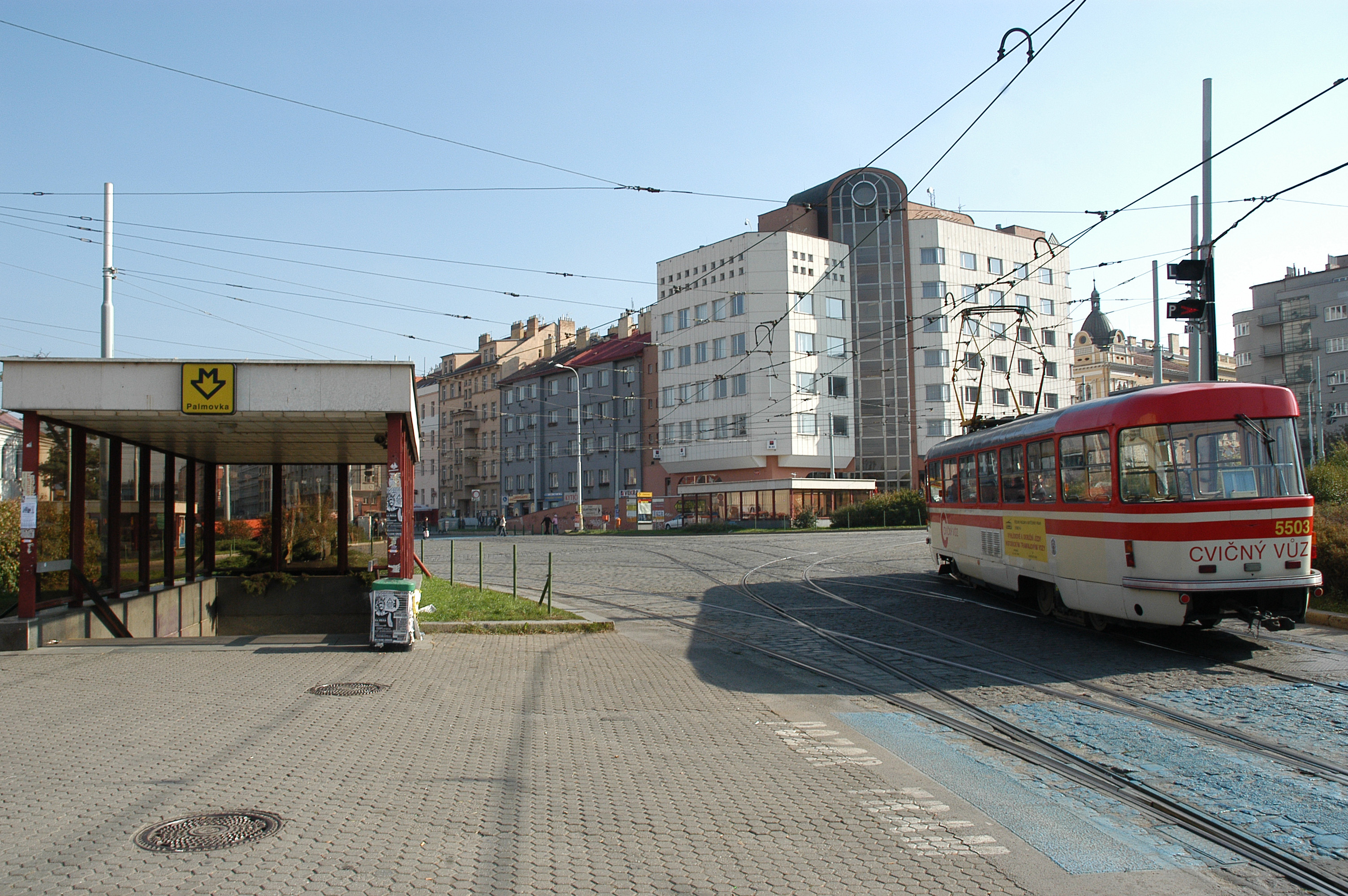
Entrance to Palmovka metro station

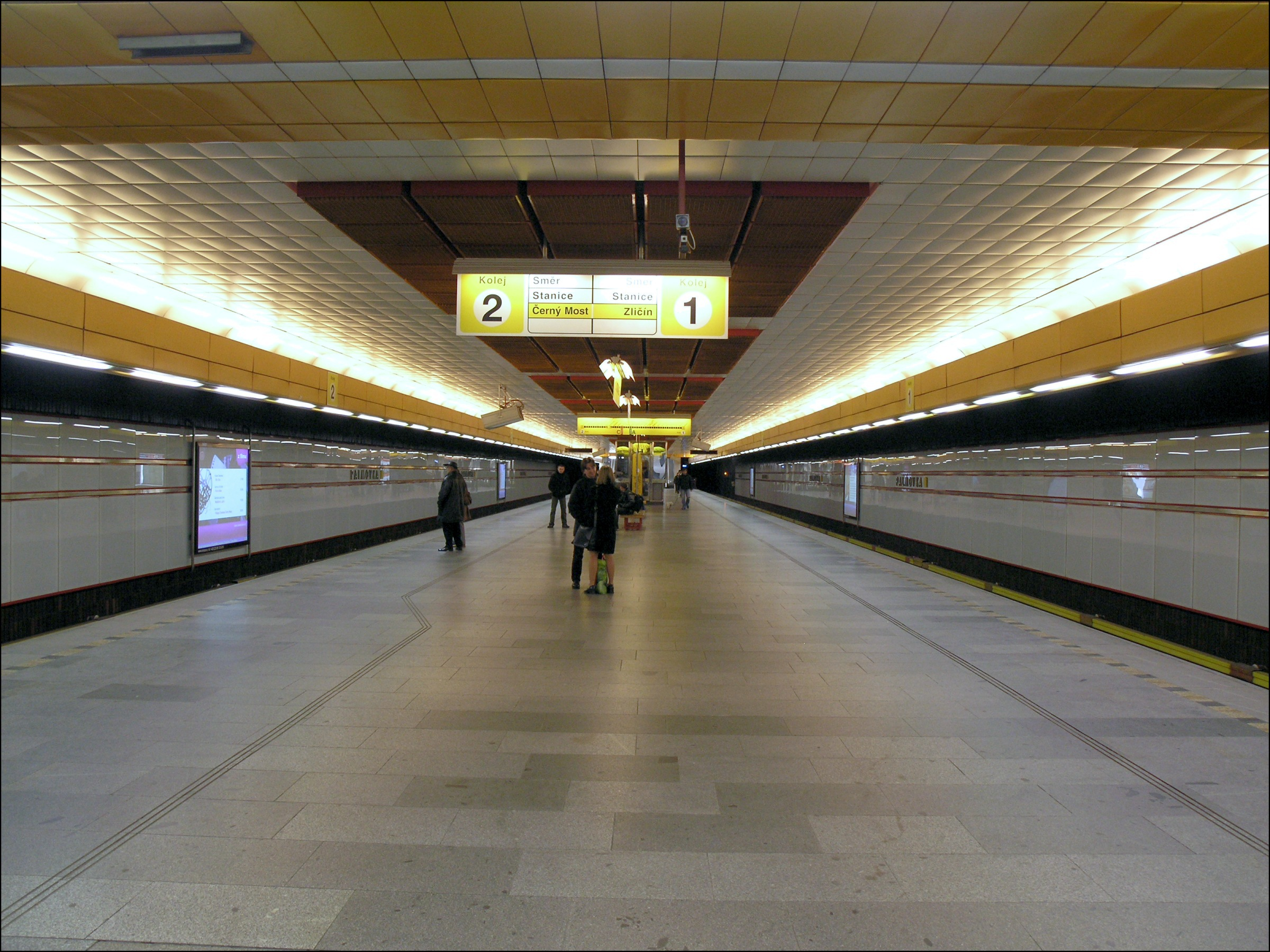
Station
