= Prague Public Transit Company =

Public transport organisation in Prague, Czech Republic

- Native name: Dopravní podnik hl. m. Prahy, akciová společnost
- Type: Joint-stock company
- Industry: Public transport
- Founded: 11 July 1991; 35 years ago
- Headquarters: Sokolovská 42/217, Vysočany, Prague, Czech Republic
- Area served: Prague
- Key people: Ladislav Urbánek (chairman and CEO)
- Revenue: 24,253,658,000 Czech koruna (2023)
- Operating income: 1,038,227,000 Czech koruna (2023)
- Net income: 1,222,616,000 Czech koruna (2023)
- Total assets: 85,382,422,000 Czech koruna (2023)
- Owner: City of Prague (100%)
- Number of employees: 11,463 (2025)
- Website: www.dpp.cz/en

Prague Public Transit Company (Czech: Dopravní podnik hlavního města Prahy; (Note: lit. 'transport company of the capital city of Prague') DPP) is the main operator of public transport in Prague, Czech Republic. It operates the Prague Metro, the city's tram and trolleybus networks, most urban bus services, and the Petřín funicular. DPP's services form the core of Prague Integrated Transport (PID), which integrates Prague's urban transport with suburban and regional bus and rail services.

DPP recorded nearly one billion passenger journeys in 2025. The present joint-stock company was established in 1991 and is wholly owned by the City of Prague.

== History ==
=== Public transport in Prague before the DPP ===
Until 1897, public transport in Prague was operated exclusively by private companies, after which the city gradually took control. A key role was played by a municipal commission established in 1890, which evolved through several forms before becoming the Electric Enterprises of the Royal Capital City of Prague. In 1897, Prague purchased the horse tram network and integrated other transport companies, completing the process of municipalisation and establishing a monopoly over public transport by 1907.

Throughout the 20th century, the enterprise underwent numerous name and structural changes, from the Electric Enterprises to the Prague Public Transport Companies. In addition to transport, it also managed electricity, gas, and water services until these sectors were nationalised in 1946, after which the company focused solely on public transport. In subsequent decades, its activities expanded (e.g., taxi services and river transport), but these were later reorganised and gradually separated, particularly after 1989.

=== 1991–present: DPP ===
Since 1991, the DPP has operated as a joint-stock company.

Between 2003 and 2006, the company underwent a major transformation aimed at improving efficiency and reducing costs, including the integration of support services and the introduction of process-based management. Some services were outsourced. At the end of 2009, financial issues emerged due to a mismatch between ordered transport services and the city's allocated budget, leading to the threat of a strike and increased social tension. In 2010, management announced plans to expand into suburban and regional transport to reduce dependence on city subsidies.

== Operations ==
DPP provides its public transport services under a long-term public-service contract with the City of Prague, effective from 1 January 2025 to 30 June 2047.

In 2025, DPP recorded about 998 million passenger journeys. Of these, about 370 million were made by metro, 368 million by tram, 250 million by bus and 10 million by trolleybus.
