= Buses in Prague =

Overview of bus transit in Prague

- An Arriva City bus in Prague

Overview
- Owner: Prague Integrated Transport
- Locale: Prague, Czech Republic
- Transit type: Bus / Bus rapid transit
- Website: dpp.cz

Operation
- Began operation: 1908
- Operators: Dopravní podnik hl. m. Prahy; Arriva City, s. r. o.; ČSAD Střední Čechy; ČSAD POLKOST, spol. s r. o.; ČSAD MHD Kladno, a. s.; MARTIN UHER, spol. s r. o.; Okresní autobusová doprava Kolín, s. r. o.; ABOUT ME, s. r. o; ARANEA, s. r. o; ARRIVA STŘEDNÍ ČECHY, s.r.o.; STENBUS, s. r. o.; Jaroslav Štěpánek; PROBO BUS a.s.; Vlastimil Slezák; Societa o. p. s.

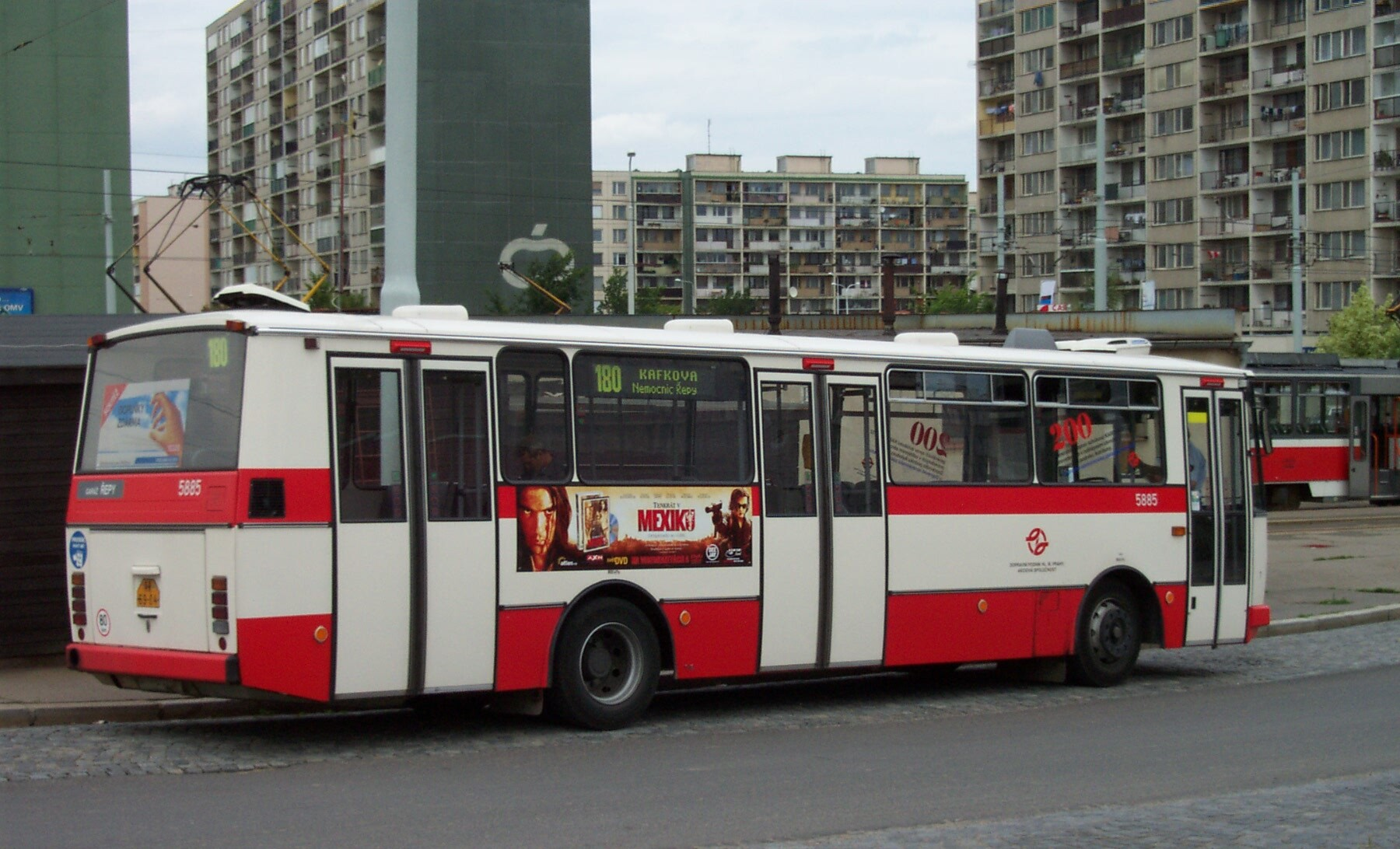
Karosa 700 bus in Prague

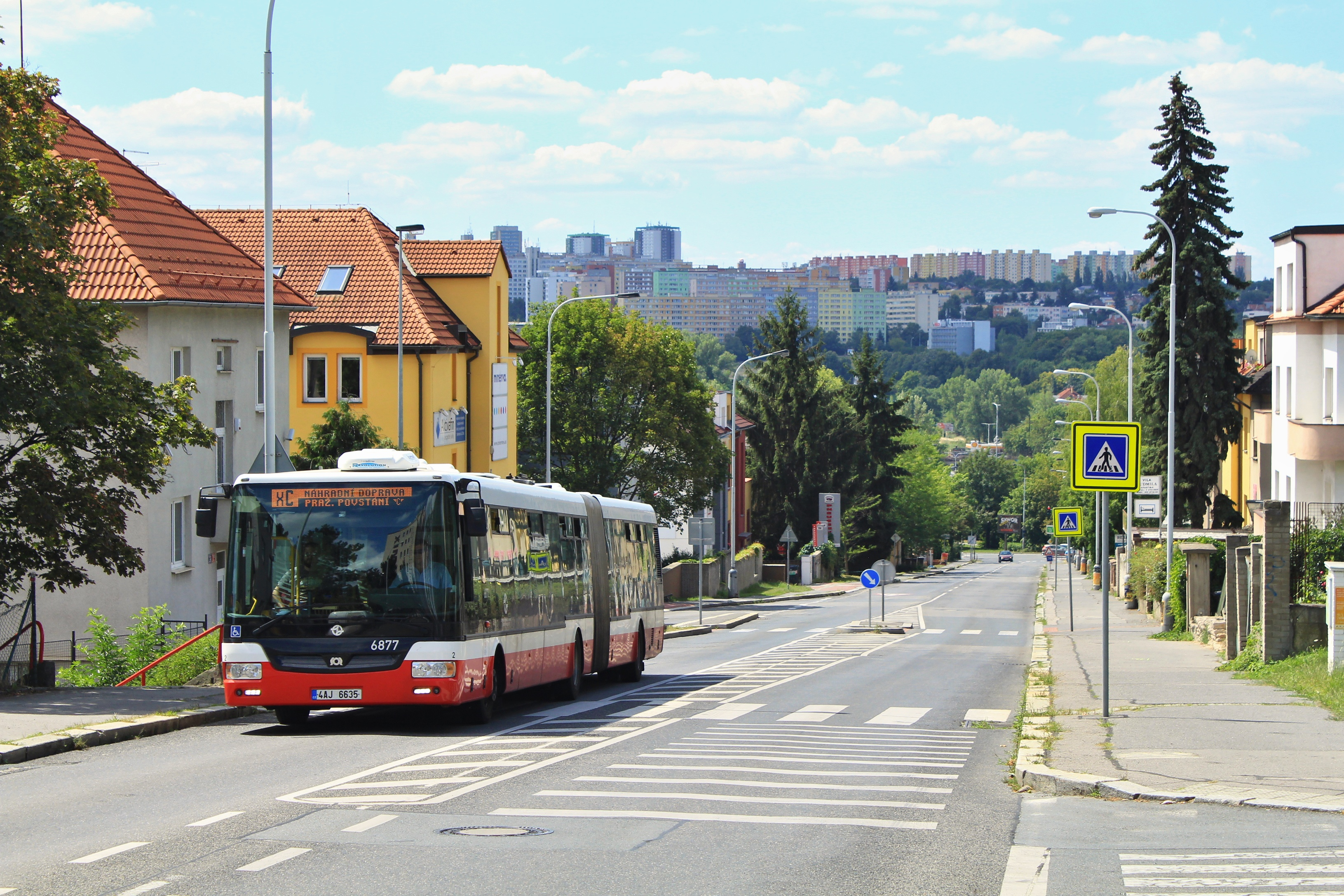
Replacement bus route XC operating during the closure of Metro Line C

Bus services in Prague have been present since the early 1900s. As of 2026, Prague has 154 bus routes served by over 1,200 buses and 37 trolleybuses almost all of which are operated by private companies under contract to (and regulated by) Prague Public Transit Company (DPP). The bus network is part of the Prague Integrated Transport system (Pražská integrovaná doprava, PID).

== History ==
=== Start of operation ===
The electric utilities decided to trial introduce a completely new type of transport, the automobile omnibus or bus, on the route between Křižovnický Náměstí and Pohořelec. The use of buses for traffic across Charles Bridge was envisaged; the technical condition of the line and also of the bridge appeared unfavorable for tram traffic.

The concession to operate the first bus line from Křižovnické Náměstí to Pohořelec was granted to the city council by the municipality on 27 September 1907.

Operation with the first two buses was officially launched on 7 March 1908 at 8AM, but the unreliable technology at the time led to the trial service being declared a failure after 20 months. Regular services did not begin again until 20 June 1925, but have been in continuous operation ever since that date.

=== Interwar period ===
As early as 1923, the electric utilities budget had allocated funds to provide transportation to Záběhlice, with consideration given not only to introducing buses but also to introducing trolleybuses or battery-powered buses. A tender for the supply of two buses was announced in 1924; an application for a license was submitted on 28 November 1924, but the district administrative authority did not issue the license until 4 June 1925.

On 18 September 1927, Route H was introduced from Jungmann Square to Žižkov. A trolleybus network was introduced in Prague in 1936.

=== Socialist times ===
Night routes were reintroduced in 1959. Starting in 1970, bus routes were introduced to new housing estates (Lhotka, Jižní Město, Spořilov). The trolleybus network closed in 1972.

=== Modern era ===
In the 1990s and 2000s, the metropolitan system was expanded and integrated with suburban transport as Prague Integrated Transport (PID), although a few areas remain outside this system.

In 2009, the long-distance bus terminal at Florenc got a revamp. With a budget of 70 million crowns, the station received 20 new cash desks, vastly improved information system and new security technology.

A review commissioned by mayor Bohuslav Svoboda and conducted by Czech Technical University in Prague together with Boston Venture Central Europe recommended postponing the changes proposed in July 2012, warning of likely delays on longer merged routes due to insufficient infrastructure priority, and estimated the expected annual savings at about 300 million CZK rather than the 406 million CZK projected in the proposal.

After precisely 45 years since the old trolleybus system closed, a new trolleybus system was opened in Prague in 2023.

== Vehicles ==
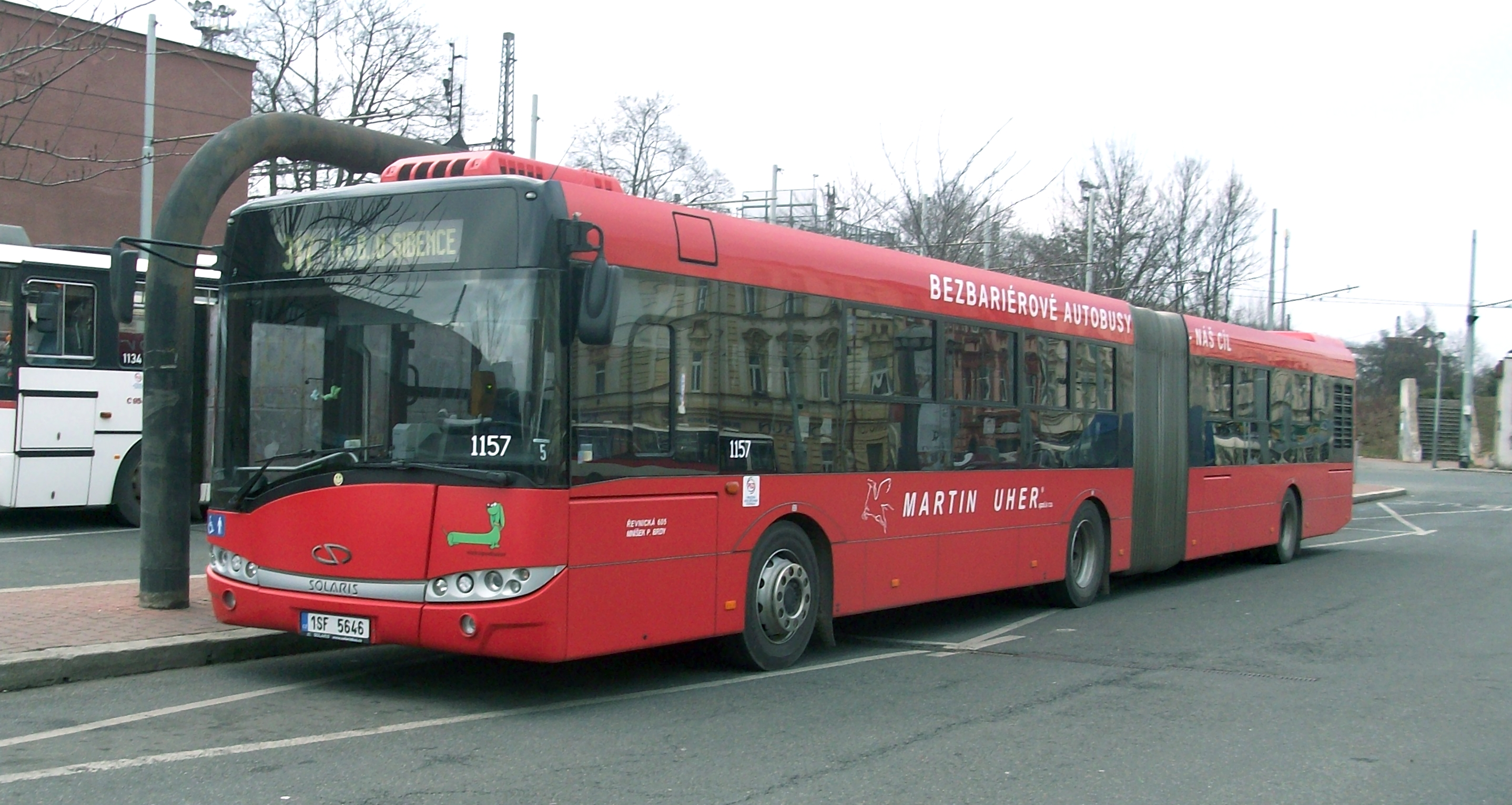
Solaris Urbino 18 of Martin Uher

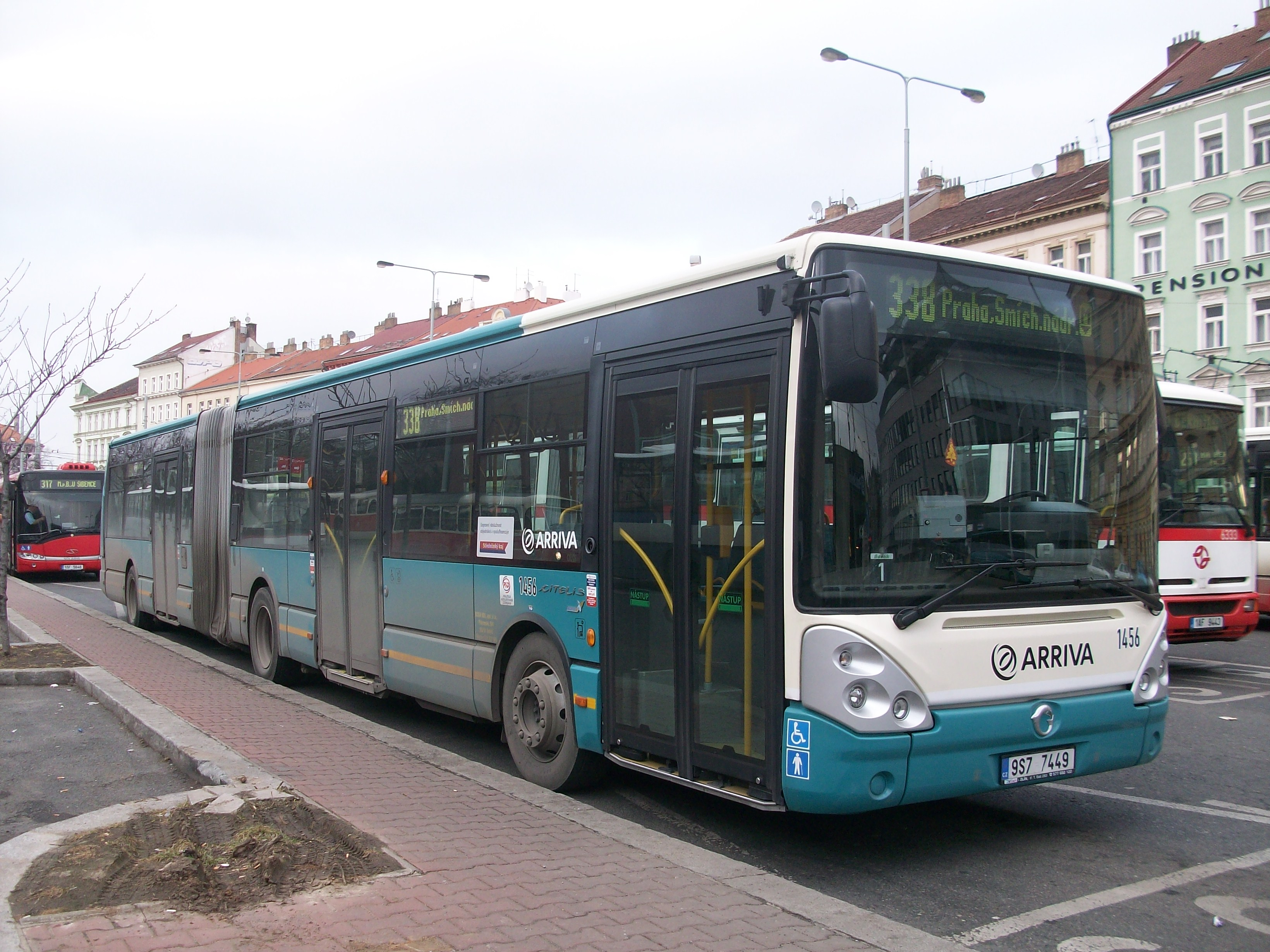
Irisbus Citelis 18 of Arriva

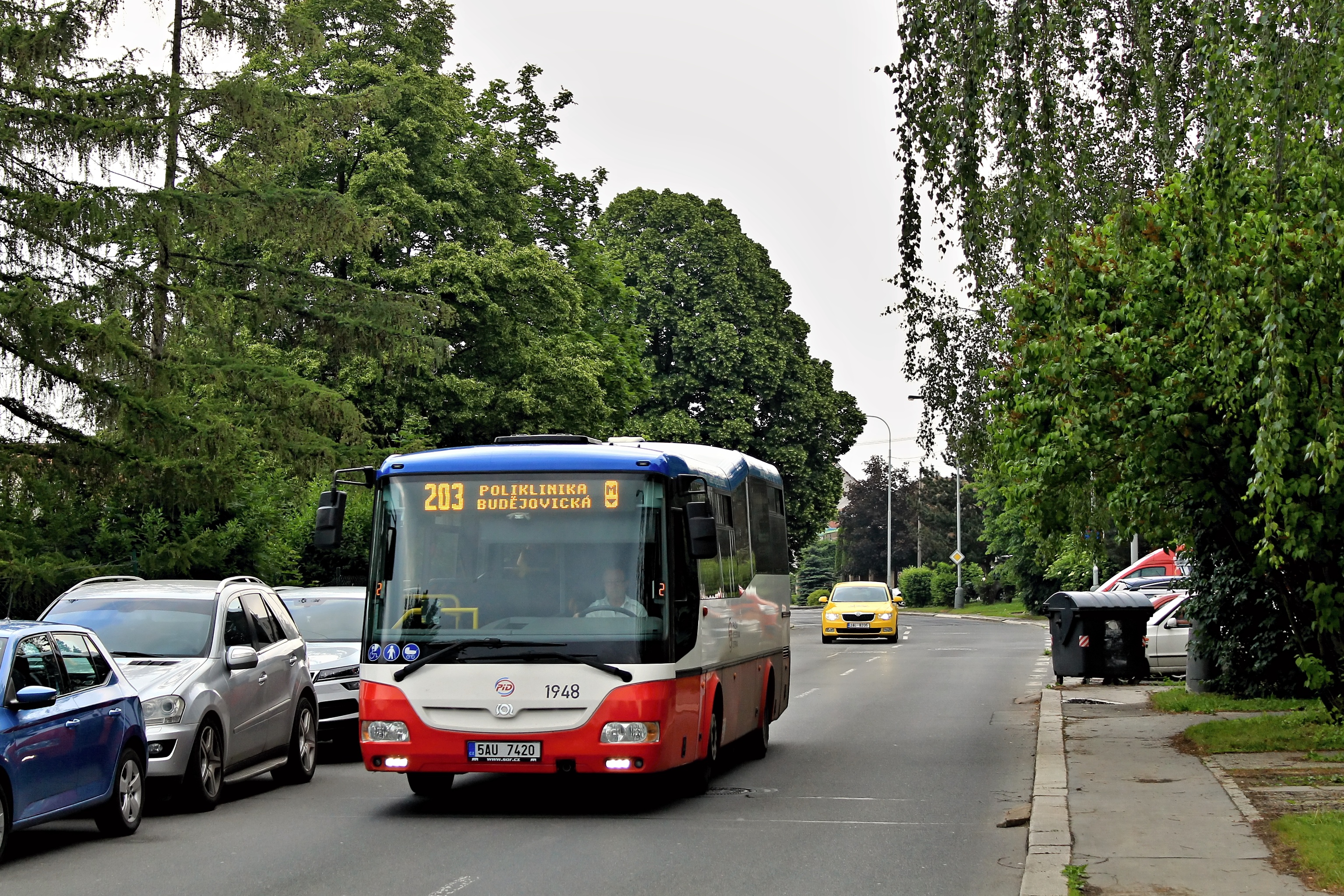
SOR BN 9.5 midibus on route 203 in the Jižní Město neighborhood

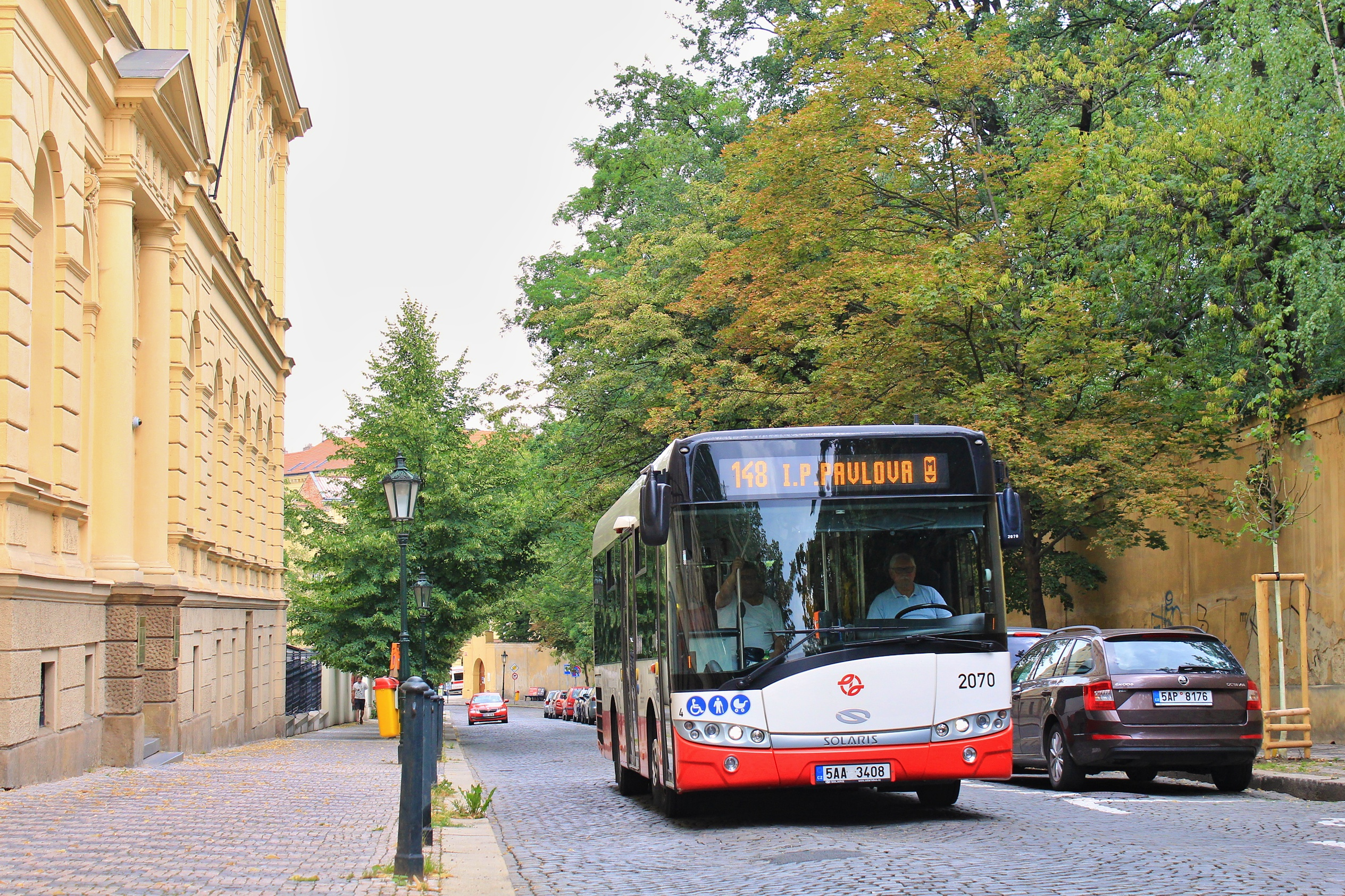
Midibus Solaris Urbino 8,9 LE, line 148 in city centre

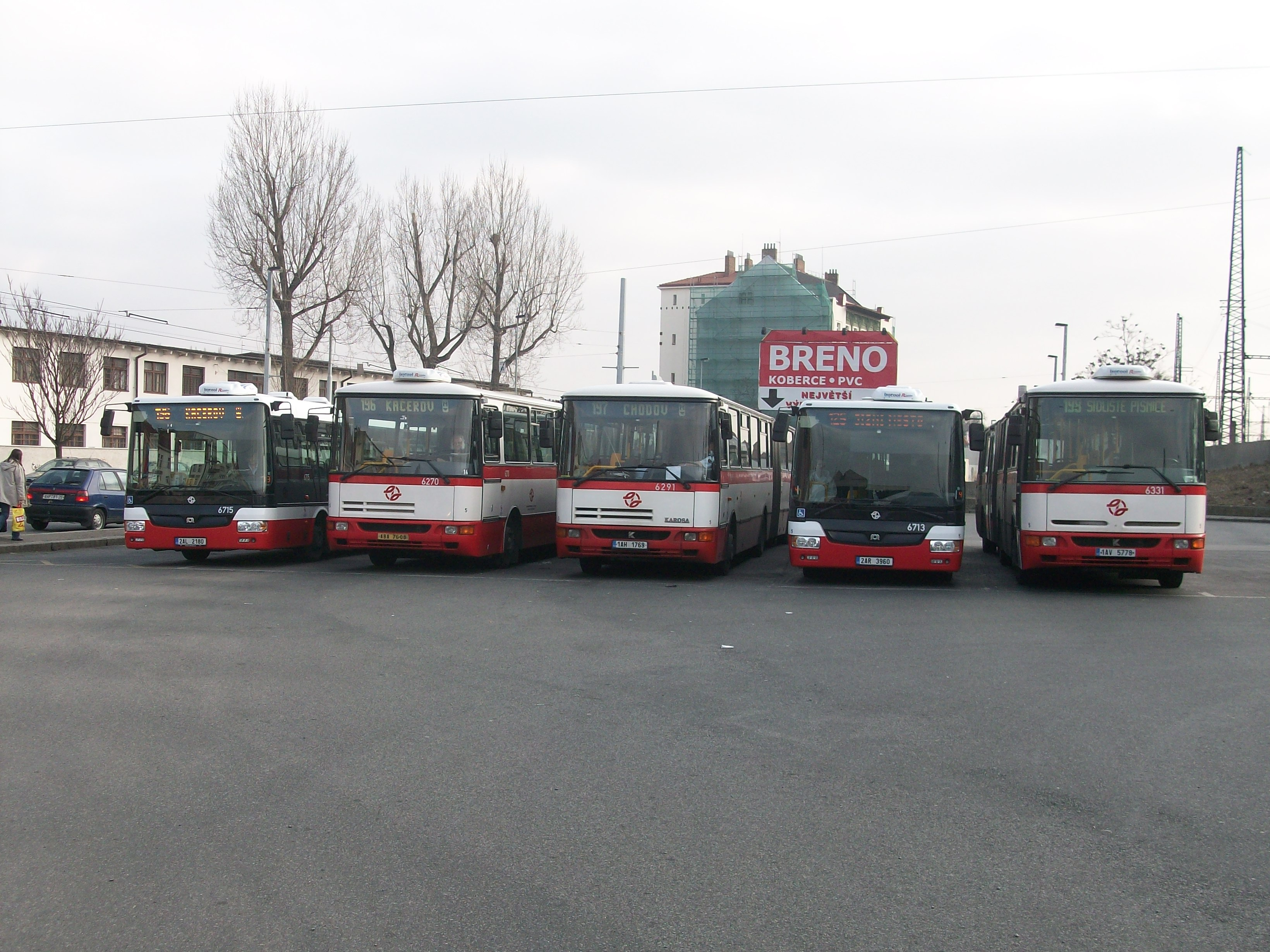
Karosa and SOR buses at Smíchovské nádraží bus station

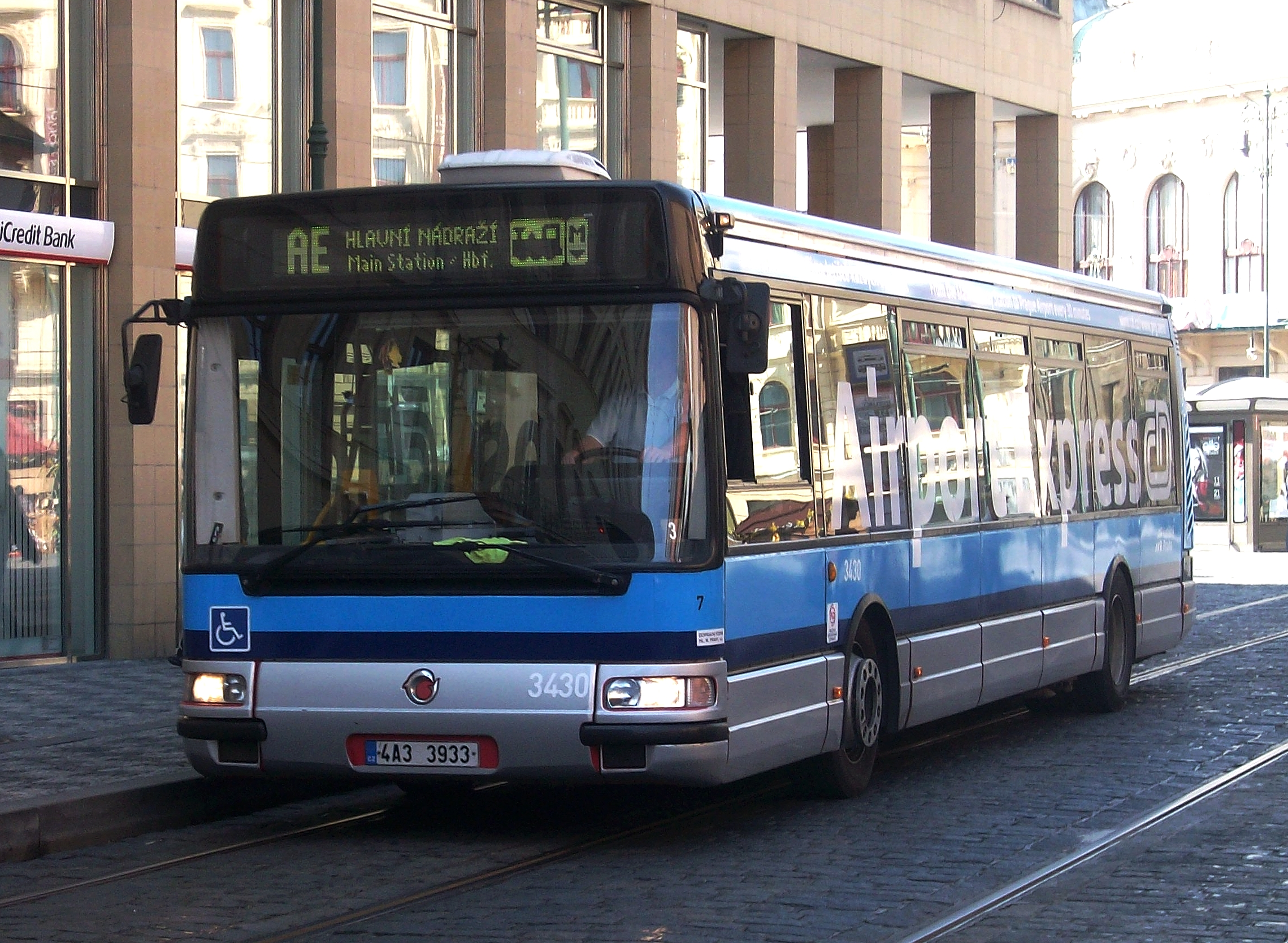
Airport Express line

=== History ===
New vehicles were introduced gradually. Škoda 706 RTO was put into service in 1959. In October 1965, the Karosa ŠM 11 model was also put into service.

By April 2005, DPP operated 119 of the Karosa B 731 buses, 186 of the Karosa B 732 buses (including 7 wheelchair-accessible models), 199 Karosa B 931 buses, 1 Karosa C 934 bus, and 91 Karosa B 951 buses, for a total of 607 standard-length (11-meter) high-floor buses. Several low-floor buses were also part of the fleet, including Neoplan and Irisbus articulated buses, four of the Ikarus E91 city midibuses and 9 tour buses.

=== Current ===
DPP uses a mix of over 1,200 buses and 37 trolleybuses which are all low-floor, single-deck, and sometimes articulated. Buses such as Solaris Urbino, SOR, Škoda and Iveco Bus operate on the routes.

In order to meet the city's criteria to halve its carbon emissions by 2030, the operator DPP is rapidly electrifying its public transit, aiming for 75% low- or zero-emission buses by 2030. In 2019, DPP trialled hybrid buses.

Since 2020, all local bus services are operated by modern low-floor buses. In 2021, Škoda unveiled the first E’City fully electric bus destined for Prague, the first of which entered service a year later. In April 2023, the DPP and Iveco Bus have signed a contract for the supply of up to 140 Urbanway Hybrid vehicles over a period of 5 years. First SOR ENS 12 electric buses entered service in December 2025.

Sub-operators are also adhering to progress with Arriva announcing 16 zero-emission buses, marking a gradual transition away from diesel vehicles.

== Operation ==
Buses fulfil many different roles in Prague's public transport system. Many lines serve as connections between the metro, tram, and rail systems and outlying residential areas.

Almost all city and suburban buses (as well as the city's metro and tramway lines, the Vltava ferries, and a funicular railway) are run as part of the Pražská integrovaná doprava (PID – Prague Integrated Transport) network, under the management of the regional organizing agency ROPID.

Main terminals of metropolitan buses are near metro stations; some suburban and long-distance buses stop there. In 2013, bus intervals on the network temporarily increased.

In 2016, the buses in Prague had an average speed of 25,3 km/h; this was exceeded by 2026, with an average speed of 25,9 km/h.

=== Prague Integrated Transport (PID) ===
Operated under PID are the following routes;

Routes	Type of service
100-250	Daytime Prague city routes
251-280	School routes
901-917	Night time city routes
951-963	Suburban routes

=== Airport buses ===
Marked AE is the Airport Express, which leaves Prague main railway station to Vaclav Havel Prague Airport every half an hour between 5:30AM and 23:30PM. Established in 2024 to replace bus route 119, trolleybus line 59 connects the airport with Prague-Veleslavín where transfer to the Prague Metro is possible. Bus line 100 also serves the airport and transfers to the Prague Metro are possible.

=== Outside the PID system ===
Many lines exist outside the PID system, including special lines to trade fairs, football matches, shopping lines, a Zoo line, and other lines outside integrated systems, mostly intercity and long-distance public lines, with small importance to city transport. The main stations of long-distance buses are Černý Most, Zličín and Florenc; the latter which is served by FlixBus.

=== Depots ===
DPP operates out of 7 depots: Dejvice, Klíčov, Liben, Vršovice, Kačerov, Pankrác, Hostivař and Řepy.

=== Ticketing ===
Tickets, costing 30–50 CZK (30–90 min) via app or card, are valid across all transport modes, in accordance with the PID system covering the city.

== Major accidents and incidents ==
- 18 April 2011: Driver killed, injuring 13 passengers as a bus overturned into a ravine.

== See also ==
- Trolleybuses in Prague
- Transport in Prague
