= Petřín funicular =

Funicular in Prague

- Petřín funicular in 2026

Overview
- Native name: Lanová dráha na Petřín
- Owner: Prague
- Line number: LD
- Locale: Petřín, Prague, Czech Republic
- Coordinates: 50°04′55″N 14°23′48″E
- Stations: 3
- Website: dpp.cz

Service
- Type: Funicular
- System: Prague Integrated Transport
- Operator: Prague Public Transit Company
- Rolling stock: 2 funicular trains

History
- Opened: 1891

Technical
- Line length: 0.509 km (0.316 mi)
- Number of tracks: Single track with passing loop
- Track gauge: 1,435 mm (4 ft 8 1/2 in) standard gauge
- Operating speed: 14.4 km/h (8.9 mph)
- Highest elevation: 126.19 m (414.0 ft)
- Maximum incline: 29.6%

The Petřín funicular (Czech: Lanová dráha na Petřín) is a funicular railway in the Czech capital city of Prague. It links the Malá Strana district with the top of Petřín (Czech pronunciation: [ˈpɛtr̝̊iːn]) hill. The funicular is part of the Prague Integrated Transport system (Pražská integrovaná doprava, PID) and is operated by the Prague Public Transit Company.

== History ==
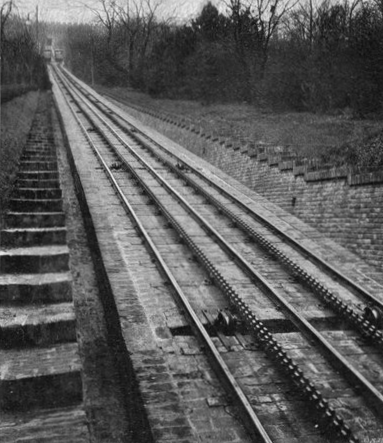
Common third rail track, early 20th century

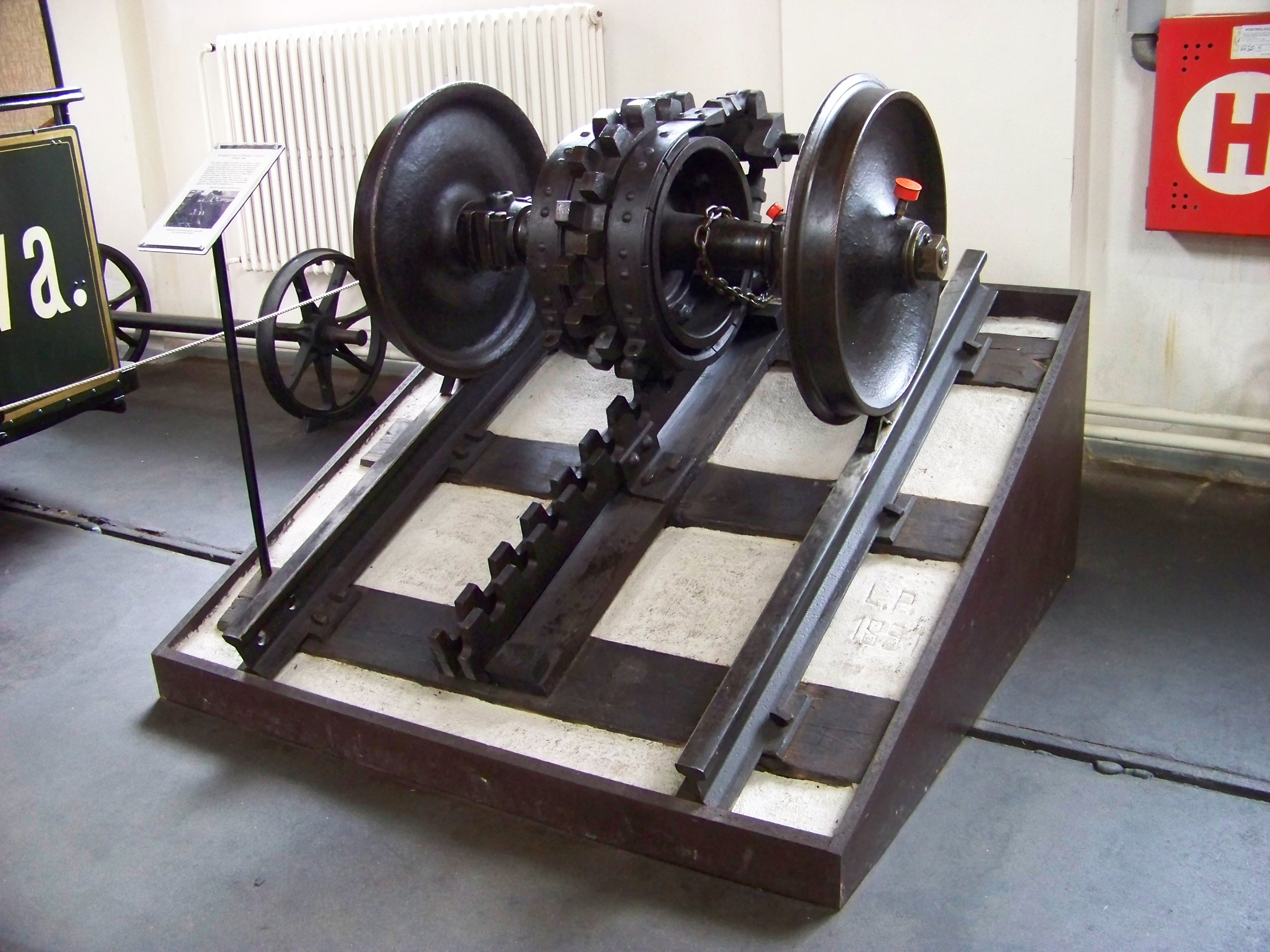
Abt brake wheelset of the first version

The line was originally opened in 1891, as a metre-gauge railway with a length of 383 metres (1,257 ft) and water balance propulsion. The cable car ran all year round, in the winter months and in the mid-1890s only on weekends, because of water freezing up the tracks.

This original line closed with start of the First World War in 1914 and did not reopen after the end of hostilities. The construction of a new funicular, in which only Prague workers participated, began on 4 November 1931. Both of the original railway stations were demolished, with the rails and the wagons dismantled. Two new cars built by Ringhoffer were put on the retracked standard-gauge railway between 3 and 10 May 1932. At the turn of May and June, test drives were carried out, followed by a successful technical-police test, and on 5 June 1932, regular operation began. The intermediate stop Nebozízek was put into operation approximately one month later, on July 9.

The line operated throughout the Second World War, with the exception of two short closures. The operation of the funicular was temporarily stopped both in the autumn of 1938 (for about one month) and at the end of the war in 1945 (for about four months). After the war, repairs of the track, buildings and replacement of the tow rope took place mostly before the Spartakiads, when an increase in passenger numbers was expected to rise.

However, a landslide in 1965 caused the service to be suspended, and it was not resumed until 1985. At that time new cars were provided and the track was reconstructed, but the original machinery retained. Both new cars were imported to Prague on 7 February 1985 and re-railed onto the track the next day. On 17 April tests began, and on 9 May 1985, a test operation without passengers began. The ceremonial opening of regular operation took place on 15 June 1985. On 19 July of the same year, the intermediate stop Nebozízek was put into operation.

The operation of the funicular was suspended on 13 September 2024 due to possibility of a landslide following heavy rains. The operation was not restored as complete refurbishment was scheduled to start in 2025, and temporary repairs would be too expensive. The scheduled refurbishment started in March 2025, and service is expected to be resumed in summer 2026. On 22 September 2026, after nearly two years, the operation of the funicular was resumed. The new fourth-generation cars, manufactured by the Austrian-Swiss Doppelmayr/Garaventa Group and designed by Czech designer Anna Marešová, can carry 120 passengers.

== Operation ==
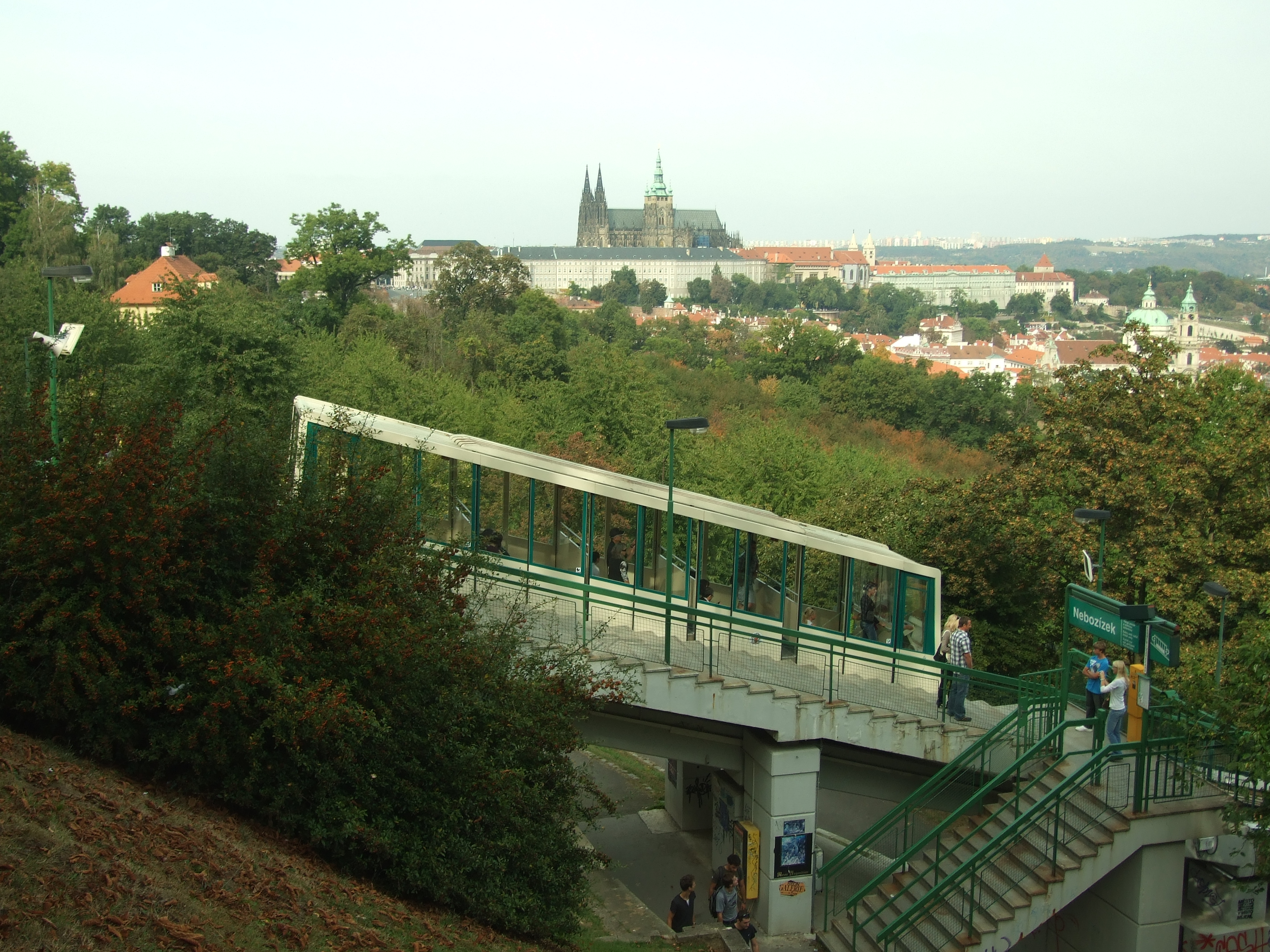
Nebozízek station (2009)

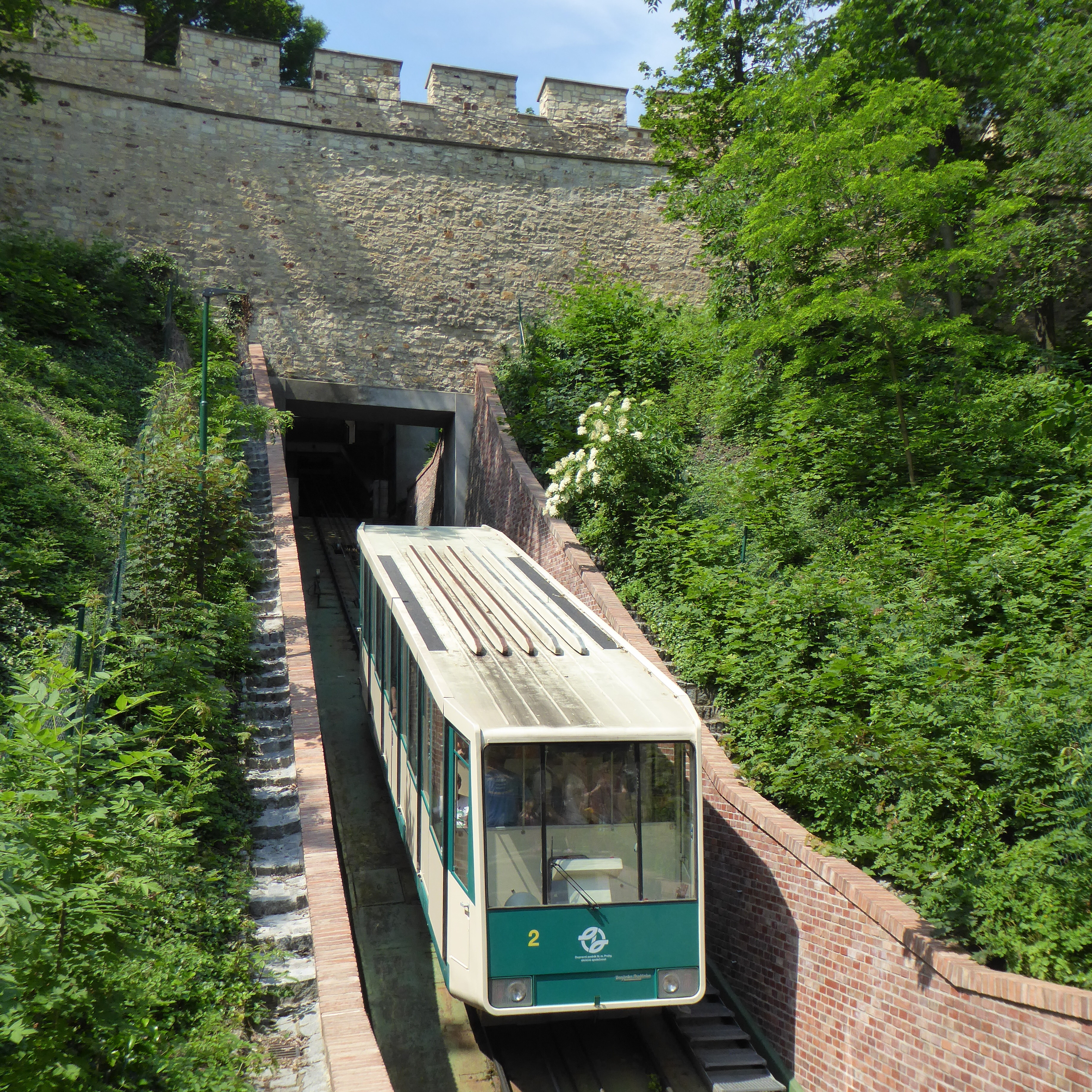
Train passes through the Hunger Wall (2016)

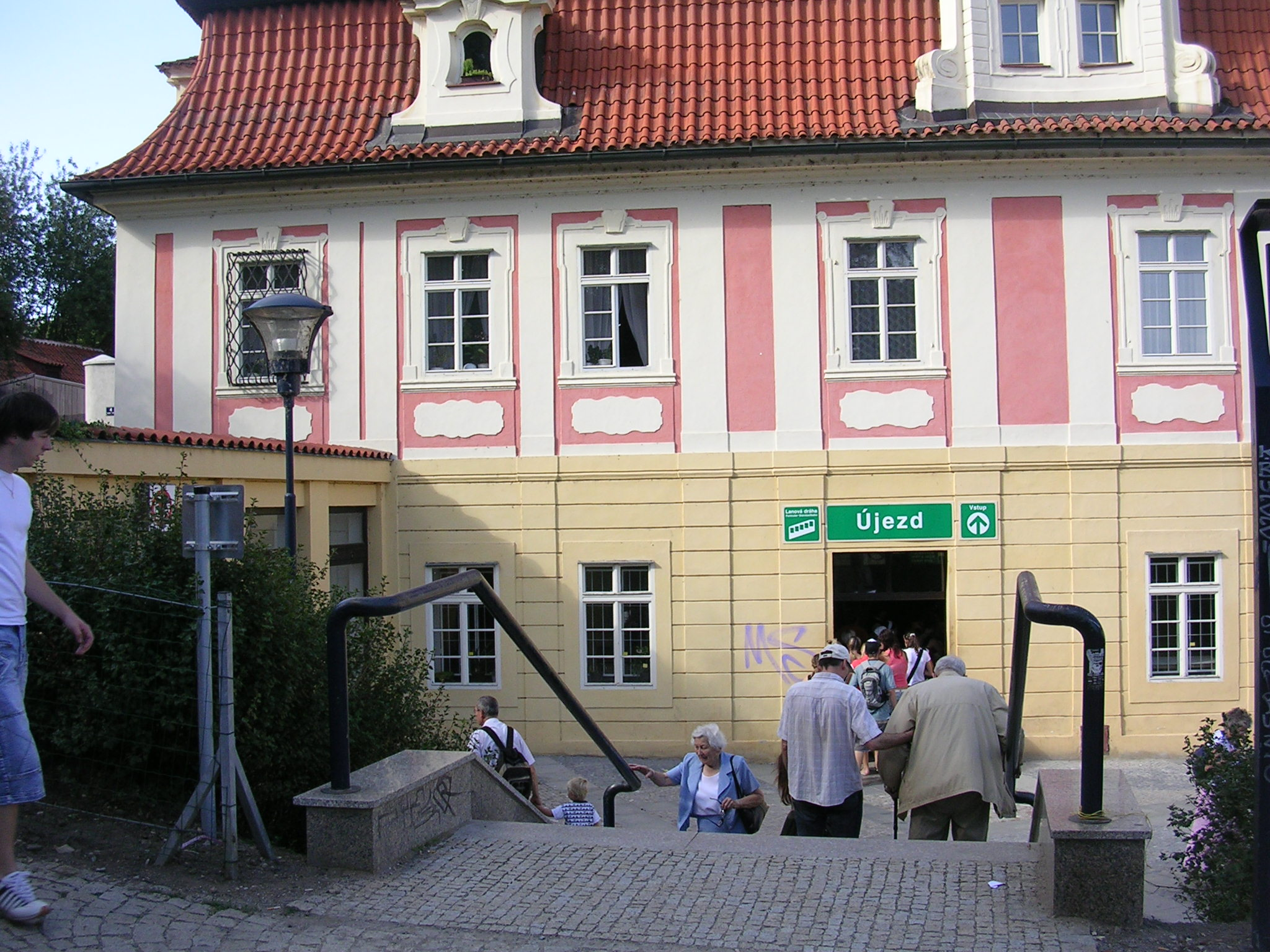
Újezd station (2006)

The funicular has three stops: Újezd (at the bottom of the hill), Nebozízek (the middle station) and Petřín (at the top of the hill). The funicular operates daily from 7 am to 10:15 pm, with the interval being 10 minutes. Short-term (30-minute and 90-minute) Prague Integrated Transport tickets are not valid for the funicular; to ride the funicular, a ticket valid for 24 hours or more is needed. One-way tickets for the funicular are also available for purchase.

== Trivia ==
According to Czech legend, the name of the middle station Nebozízek stems from an incident in which a son of Emperor Charles IV, requesting food, was unable to properly pronounce the Czech letter "ř" when he asked for a schnitzel, so instead of "nebo řízek" (meaning, "or schnitzel"), he expressed the word Nebozízek which actually means little gimlet.

== Gallery ==
Petřín Funicular (2026-09-22) (autor Skot)

Interior (2026) (autor MartinMerinsky)

Abt switch (2026) (autor Lopatalopez)

Nebozizek station (2026) (autor MartinMerinsky)

== See also ==
- List of funicular railways
