= Škoda 706 RTO-K =

Prototype articulated bus produced by Czechoslovak bus manufacturers Karosa and Škoda

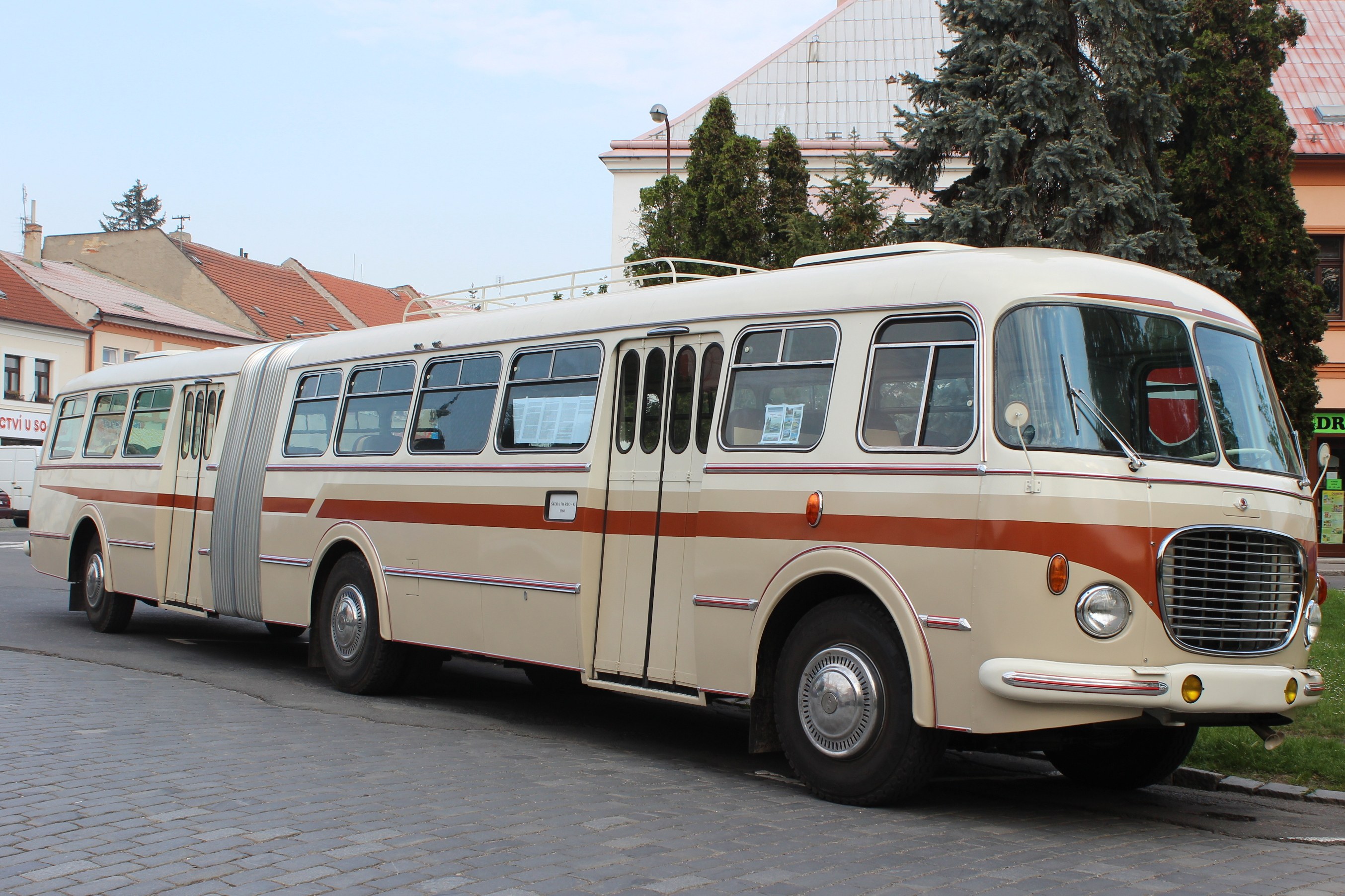
- Replica of Škoda 706 RTO in Český Brod, Czech Republic

Overview
- Manufacturer: Karosa, Škoda

Body and chassis
- Floor type: High-floor
- Chassis: Body on frame

Powertrain
- Engine: Škoda 706
- Capacity: 64 standing 41 sitting
- Power output: 117,6 kW

Dimensions
- Length: 16120 mm
- Width: 2500 mm
- Height: 2980 mm
- Curb weight: 12165 kg

Chronology
- Successor: Karosa ŠM 16,5

Škoda 706 RTO-K was a prototype of an articulated urban bus produced by bus manufacturer Karosa and Škoda of Czechoslovakia, in the year 1960. It was succeeded by Karosa ŠM 16,5 in 1968.

== Construction features ==
706 RTO-K is a three-axle bus with rear B axle driven. The front part is almost identical to that of Škoda 706 RTO buses, also based on the rear of this type, but has been modified. The Bus has four two folding doors on the right and additional small door on the left side panel, which lead directly to driver's cab. Inside are the seats for passengers arranged in a 2 + 2 layout with central aisle.

Bus 706 RTO-K also had a peculiarity each axle or suspension. The front axle was suspension with leaf springs, using a central axle air suspension, rear axle uses pneumatic suspension with membrane.

== Production and operation ==
In 1960, a single prototype (the first Czechoslovak articulated bus) was made, but mass production never started. The prototype was tested starting in 1961 at ČSAD Praha, both on suburban routes (e.g. Prague - Horní Počernice) and long distance lines (e.g. Prague - Pec pod Sněžkou). In trial runs with passengers, the prototype proved successful; the only complaints from drivers concerned a weak engine that had problems when the bus was fully occupied. In 1966, the bus was apparently handed over to the enterprise Chirana Brno, which scrapped it in 1969.

After the failure of the production of articulated RTO buses in Czechoslovakia, serial production began in large numbers under a license in Poland (like standard buses Škoda 706 RTO). Buses were produced initially as Jelcz AP 02 (a little longer than 706 RTO-K), then Jelcz AP 021 (a little smaller than 706 RTO-K) was released and produced until 1975.

=== Romania ===
In Bucharest, Romania ITB (today called STB) modified some short Skoda 706 RTOs into articulated buses at local enterprise, URAC. This was done in the mid 1960s in order to increase capacity of transport due to crowding. They were operated until mid 1970s. There were two versions of this Romanian alteration: First had a total length of about 16.5 meters, but due to several mechanical and handling issues and lack of motor power, the length was dropped to about 15.5 meters. This was the second version. They were used prior to mid 1970s when Ikarus 280 appeared and was considered as a better option. However, prior to this, ITB also operated some Ikarus 180. The Romanian modified Skoda 706 articulated was solely used in Bucharest, scrapped in the mid 1970s and no vehicle survived. They were considered widely outdated, unsafe and Ikarus 260 and 280 and the newly introduced ROMAN 112 UD, were considered much more modern and safe.

== Replica ==
A replica was built in Zlín for a private collector, starting in 2010. In 2013, it was finished and introduced to the public in Prague.

== Historical vehicles ==
- replica of Škoda 706 RTO-K built from two 706 RTO buses

== See also ==
- List of buses
