= Prague Integrated Transport =

Public transport system in Czechia

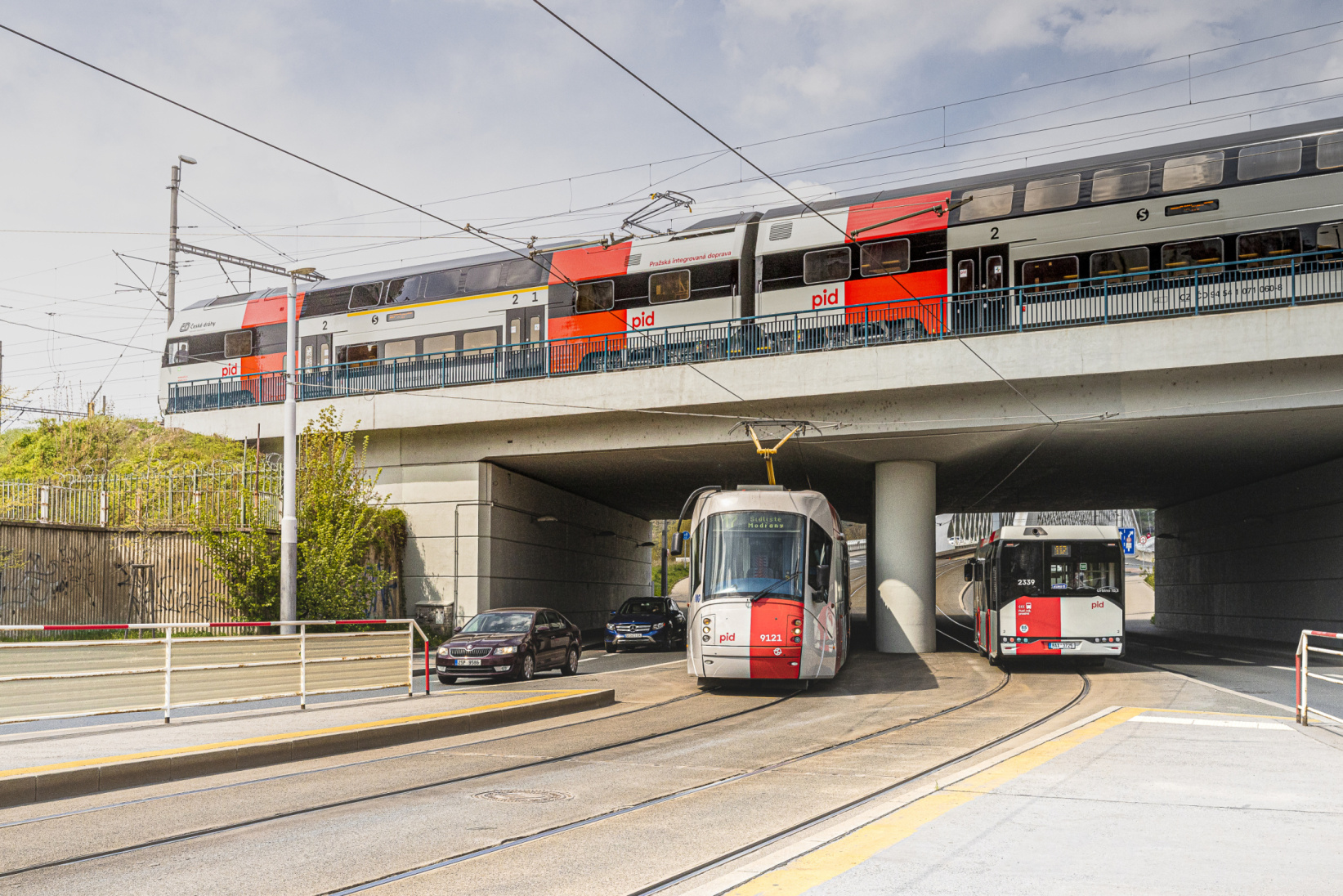

Overview
- Native name: Pražská integrovaná doprava
- Locale: Prague and Central Bohemian Region
- Transit type: Metro A B C; Tram; Trolleybus; Bus; Suburban and regional rail; Funicular; Ferry
- Number of lines: 548
- Number of stations: 3,957
- Website: pid.cz

Operation
- Began operation: 1993
- Operators: Prague Public Transit Company (metro, tram, trolleybus, most urban buses, funicular); Multiple regional bus and rail operators

Prague Integrated Transport (Czech: Pražská integrovaná doprava, PID) is an integrated public transport system serving Prague and the Central Bohemian Region, with some services extending into neighbouring regions. It integrates metro, tram, trolleybus, bus, suburban and regional rail, ferry and funicular services under a common fare and coordinated transport network. Since 2021 it also includes bike-sharing services.

PID is jointly organised by the Regional Organiser of Prague Integrated Transport (ROPID) and Integrated Transport of the Central Bohemian Region (IDSK). The system uses a common fare and ticketing system across participating modes and operators, with coordinated routes and timetables.

== Visual identity ==
PID introduced a new visual identity in 2021, based on a design by the Prague studio superlative.works selected in a 2019 competition. The design includes a new logo, signage and information graphics, the custom PID Grotesk typeface, and a common red-and-light-grey livery for vehicles operating within the system.

The visual identity received a Red Dot Design Award in 2022.

== Fares and ticketing ==
PID uses a common fare system across Prague and the Central Bohemian Region. Fares are based on both travel time and the number of tariff zones crossed. Prague consists of zones P, 0 and B, while the surrounding region is divided into zones 1 to 13.

Most services operate on a proof-of-payment system. Paper tickets must normally be validated when a journey begins, while tickets bought through the PID Lítačka app are activated electronically.

As of 2026, a 30-minute Prague ticket costs 36 CZK in the app or 39 CZK on paper, while a 90-minute ticket costs 46 CZK or 50 CZK respectively. Prague season tickets cost 550 CZK for one month and 3,650 CZK for one year.

== Transport operators ==
Most of the inner-city services are operated by the city-owned Prague Public Transit Company (Czech: Dopravní podnik hl. m. Prahy, DPP), which operates all metro, tram and trolleybus services, most urban bus services, and the Petřín funicular. Regional bus and rail services are provided by numerous operators participating in PID.

Participating operators are required to meet PID quality standards, which set common requirements for areas such as service reliability, passenger information, vehicle equipment and appearance.

=== Rail services ===
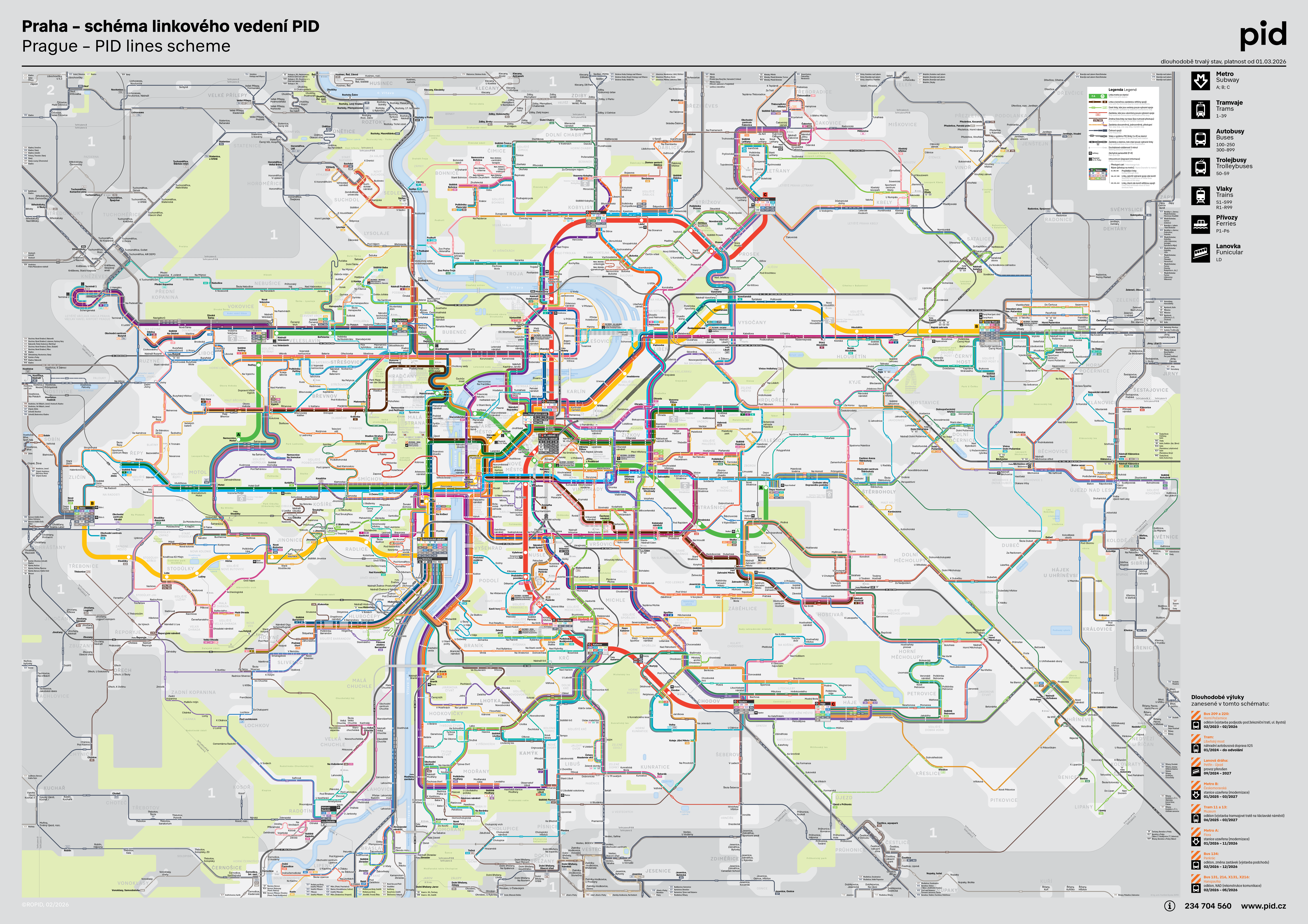
Map of the Prague integrated transport network (2026)

Rail services within PID connect Prague with the Central Bohemian Region. Participating trains are integrated into the PID fare system, allowing passengers to use the sames.

Most rail services are operated by České dráhy, with additional services provided by ARRIVA vlaky, KŽC Doprava, RegioJet and Die Länderbahn.

=== Metro, trams and funicular ===
A Tatra KT8D5R.N2P tram in the new design scheme of Prague Integrated Transport

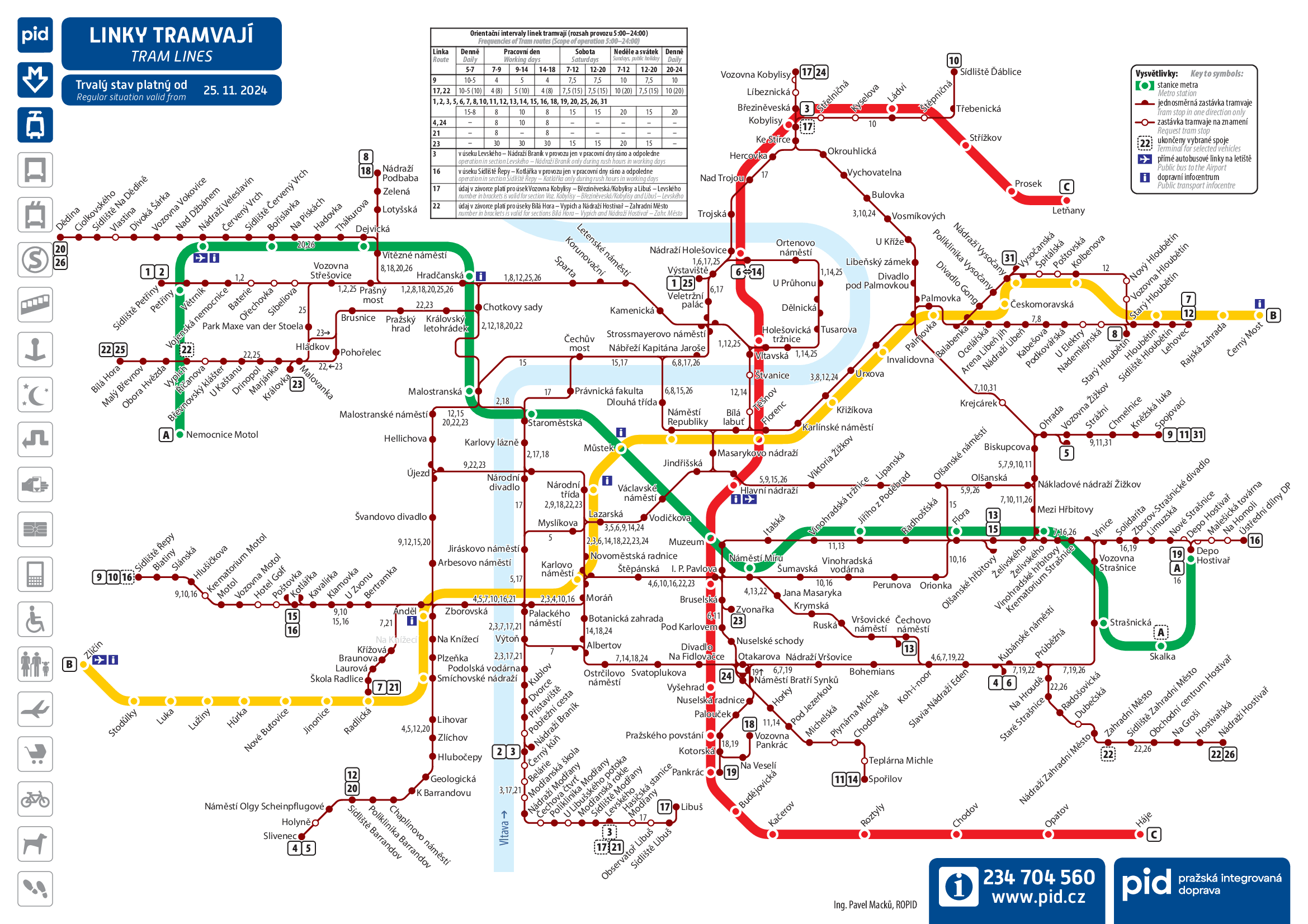
Map of metro and tram network in Prague, 2024

Unlike bus and rail services within PID, the Prague Metro, Prague's tram network and the Petřín funicular are all operated by the city-owned Prague Public Transit Company (DPP).

=== Trolleybus services ===
All trolleybus services within PID are operated by the Prague Public Transit Company (DPP).

=== Bus and coach services ===
Most urban bus services in Prague are operated by the Prague Public Transit Company (DPP). Other urban routes are operated by contracted companies including ARRIVA CITY, ČSAD Střední Čechy and ABOUT ME. Suburban and regional bus services are provided by DPP and numerous other operators throughout the PID network.

=== Ferry services ===
PID includes several ferry routes across the Vltava in Prague. Pražské Benátky operates lines P1, P2, P5 and P6, while Pražská paroplavební společnost operates line P4.
