= Trolleybuses in Prague =

Public transit system in Czechia

Prague trolleybus system

- Prague trolleybuses on line 52

Operation
- Locale: Prague, Czech Republic

Statistics
First era: 1936–1972
- Status: Closed
- Routes: 14 (maximum)
- Electrification: 600 V DC parallel overhead lines
- Stock: 179 trolleybuses (at maximum)
- Route length: 48 km (30 mi) (maximum)
Current era: since 2017
- Status: Open
- Routes: 5
- Electrification: 750 V DC parallel overhead lines

Prague was the first city in Czechoslovakia to introduce modern trolleybuses. Only a few other trolleybus systems existed previously in the Czech lands – in České Velenice (Gmünd) and České Budějovice – using the same overhead system as the Electromote, the predecessor of all trolleybuses.

Trolleybuses operated in Prague during two separate periods. The first trolleybus system was opened in 1936 and it lasted until 1972, when it was closed. After precisely 45 years, a new trolleybus system was opened in Prague in 2017. The network is a part of the Prague Integrated Transport, the city's integrated public transport system.

== Existing network ==
At present, 2 trolleybus lines are in operation in Prague. The expected starting date of the first line of the second system was in the first quarter of 2023, however due to delays in the delivery of the vehicles caused by missing hardware pieces for the electric part and long optimizations of their replacements, the first line (58 – replacing bus line 140) was only started fully operating on 1 February 2024. The vehicles kept encountering problems so were often accompanied by buses, however the number of buses has slowly reduced. As only 15 vehicles for this line are available and the requirement may reach up to 14 at peak hours, it is possible that if an accident happens or some issue with more vehicles occurs, regular diesel buses will still need to jump in for help.

Another line was opened shortly after the first one (59 – replacing bus line 119) on 6 March 2024, when at around 3pm started replacing the bus line operating to the Prague's Airport.

Many more lines are currently in preparation. The closes is current bus line 137 (to become line 52). The construction of its wired network should start in 2024 and should be a great benefit to locals as just like with line 58 it runs in a hilly terrain. Coincidentally both lines 58 and 52 were already operated by trolleybuses in the first trolleybus era.

A list of Prague's trolleybus lines in its second system
| Line number | | Operational details | | | | | Dates | |
| Trolleybus | Original bus | Vehicles | Line length | Wired percentage | Start point | End point | Construction | Start date |
|---|---|---|---|---|---|---|---|---|
| 51 | 131 | SOR TNS 12; Bozankaya SNG 12T | 6 km | 63% | Bořislavka | Hradčanská | 2025–2026 | 26 June 2026 |
| 52 | 137 | SOR TNS 12; Bozankaya SNG 12T | 3 km | 73%^{(1)} | Na Knížecí | U Waltrovky - Jinonice | 2024–2026 | 1 April 2026 |
| 53 | 176 | SOR TNS 12; Bozankaya SNG 12T | 5 km | 70% | Karlovo náměstí | Stadion Strahov | 2025–2026 | 26 June 2026 |
| 58 | 140 | SOR TNS 18 | 11,5 km | 50% | Palmovka | Čakovice -Miskovice | 2017 Q3, 2021 Q4, 2022 | 1 February 2024 |
| 59 | 119 | Škoda-Solaris 24m | 8 km | 50% | Nádraží Veleslavín | Prague Airport | 2023 | 6 March 2024 |

Lines 52 Some trips of this line continue 1,5 km further from U Waltrovky to Jinonice. 48% of this route variation is wired.

Trolleybus lines in 2028
| Line number | | Operational details | | | | Dates |
| Trolleybus | Original bus | Line length | Wired percentage | Start point | End point | Expected starting date |
|---|---|---|---|---|---|---|
| 55 | 225+142 | | | Nové Butovice | Sídlište na Dědině | 2027-2028 |
| 56 | 191 | 19.5 km | 78% | Na knížecí | Letiště | 2027-2028 |
| 57 | 136+150 | | | Sídliště Čakovice | Na Beránku | 2028 |
| 61 | 201 | 22 km | 58% | Nádraží Holešovice | Černý Most | 2028 |
| 64 | 174 | | | Vypich | Nádraží Řeporyje | ~2027 |
| 65 | 184 | | | Vypich | Velká Ohrada | |
| 75 | 375 | 22 km | 55% | Nádraží Libeň | Brandýs nad Labem-Stará Boleslav, railway station | ~2027 |

== History ==
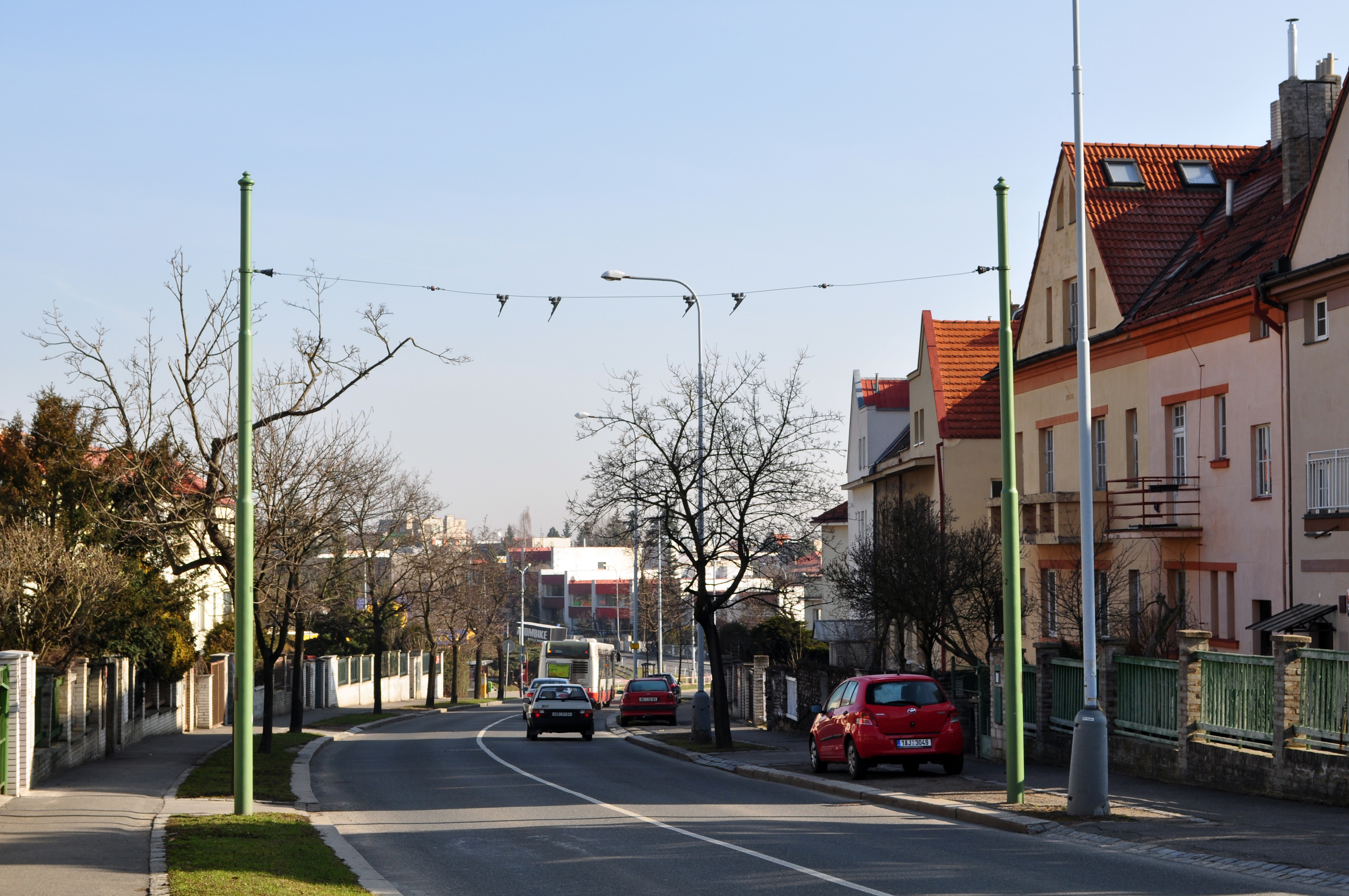
Trolleybus monument finished on 1 July 2009 at a location along the route of first Prague's trolleybus line.

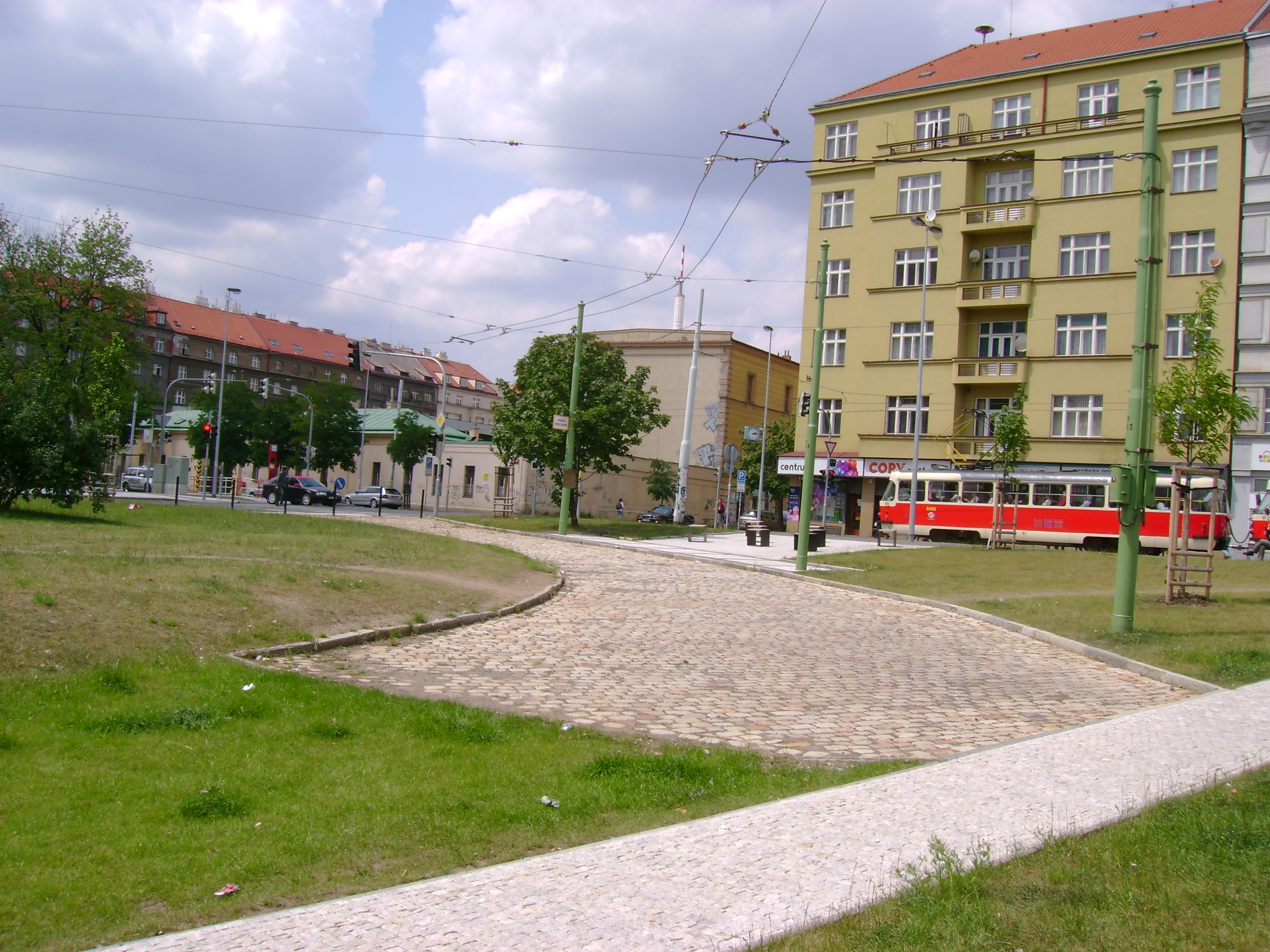
Trolleybus monument finished on 8 October 2010 at the site of the Orionka terminus of Prague's first trolleybus system, closed in 1972.

=== First system ===
The first system was opened on 28 September 1936 with a 3.5 km-long line. After World War II, the system expanded rapidly, and trolleybuses appeared in the city center, as well as in the suburban areas and big housing developments. The network reached its maximum length of 56.876 km in March 1959. However, by 1959, the first and oldest trolleybus line had already closed. Most sections which were under construction at that time were not finished, and those in operation were slowly replaced with diesel buses.

After 1960, no new trolleybuses were purchased and vehicles started becoming obsolete. Many streets were being reconstructed, there was not enough electricity available to run the network, and diesel fuel was inexpensive, which all contributed to the decision to begin replacing trolleybuses with buses, leading ultimately to the final closure of the Prague trolleybus system on 16 October 1972.

==== Fleet ====
In 1936, the following Czech-made vehicles started operating on the Prague trolleybus system:

- Škoda 1Tr (1 prototype)
- Tatra T 86 (1 prototype + 5)
- Praga TOT (1 prototype + 11)

In 1938 and 1939, two Škoda 2Tr trolleybuses were delivered.

A Tatra T400 began operating in Prague in 1948. In total, there were 136 new vehicles of that type, as well as eight second-hand vehicles from Most, purchased and running in Prague. New vehicles were supplied in various series up to 1955, based on the previous experience with the vehicles, as well as to utilize new technology.

In 1958, a prototype of the Tatra T401 model was added to Prague's trolleybus fleet but it only lasted three years in operation. The performance and features of the Tatra T401 were tested during the first two years of operation, after which it was decided that the Škoda Works, which produced smaller trolleybuses, would take over all trolleybus production in Czechoslovakia, and the Tatra company stopped producing trolleybuses.

Finally, in 1960, the last 35 Škoda 8Tr trolleybuses were purchased for Prague.

Tatra T400 and Škoda 8Tr vehicles were running in the city until the end of trolleybus operation in 1972.

=== Attempts to re-open the system in the 1980s and early 1990s ===
Plans to restore trolleybus network in Prague started appearing in 1979. Soon after the political revolution of 1989, Prague's public transport company even delegated money and people to look into the reinstatement of the trolleybus network. A prototype of a new trolleybus model, the Škoda 17Tr, was developed and produced in Prague. After 1992, however, all plans to restore the network were dropped.

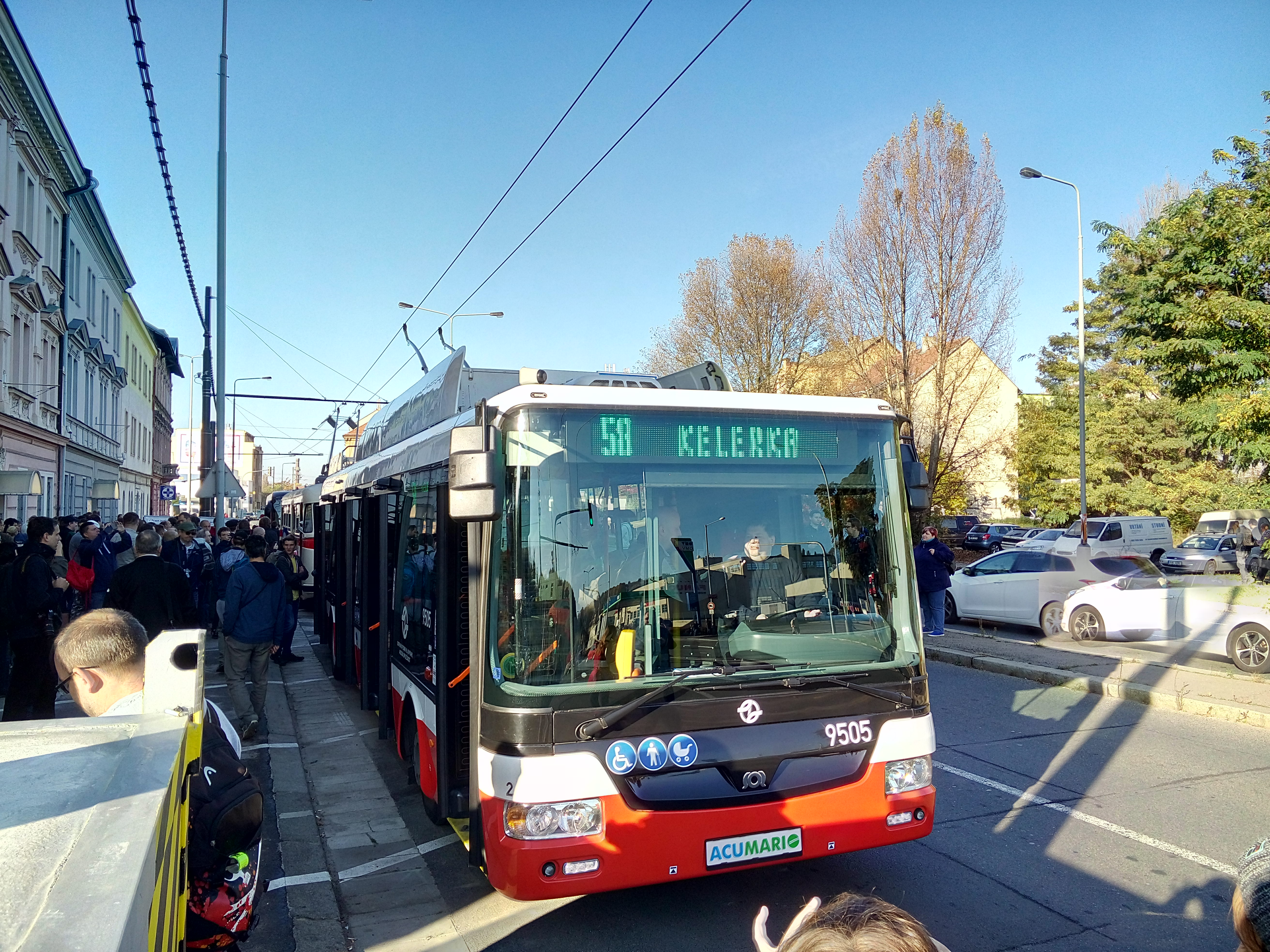
An SOR TNB 12 trolleybus on the opening day of the new system

=== Second system ===
After precisely 45 years, on 15 October 2017, a new trolleybus line was opened in Prague. The system was equipped with overhead wires along less than 1 km of the route's length and required trolleybuses with additional batteries, capable of operating away from the wires, along other parts of the route. The goal of that experimental project was to prove the viability of trolleybuses in Prague, as well as demonstrating how to minimize the cost of building the infrastructure. Overhead wires have been installed along Prosecká Street, which features a steep gradient. That will prevent a fast battery drain for vehicles running uphill as well as charging their batteries for the rest of their journey outside of the wired portion of the route. In winter, the overhead power supply also allowed for a tank of water to be heated for interior heating.

Prior to constructing a new trolleybus network, Prague's public transport company had been trying out battery-powered buses on various routes. Starting in 2014, the tests revealed that battery-powered vehicles tended to be very problematic on steep hills typical of Prague's landscape. The idea of a trolleybus network came as a direct response to the major problems with the battery-powered vehicles, aiming to combine the best attributes of both worlds.

The testing period was to take about a year, and once finished it was hoped that the network would be extended and new articulated trolleybuses with additional batteries purchased.

The first vehicle to operate on the line was a Czech-made SOR TNB 12 AcuMario, but it was a prototype, as it was the first vehicle to be equipped with additional batteries.

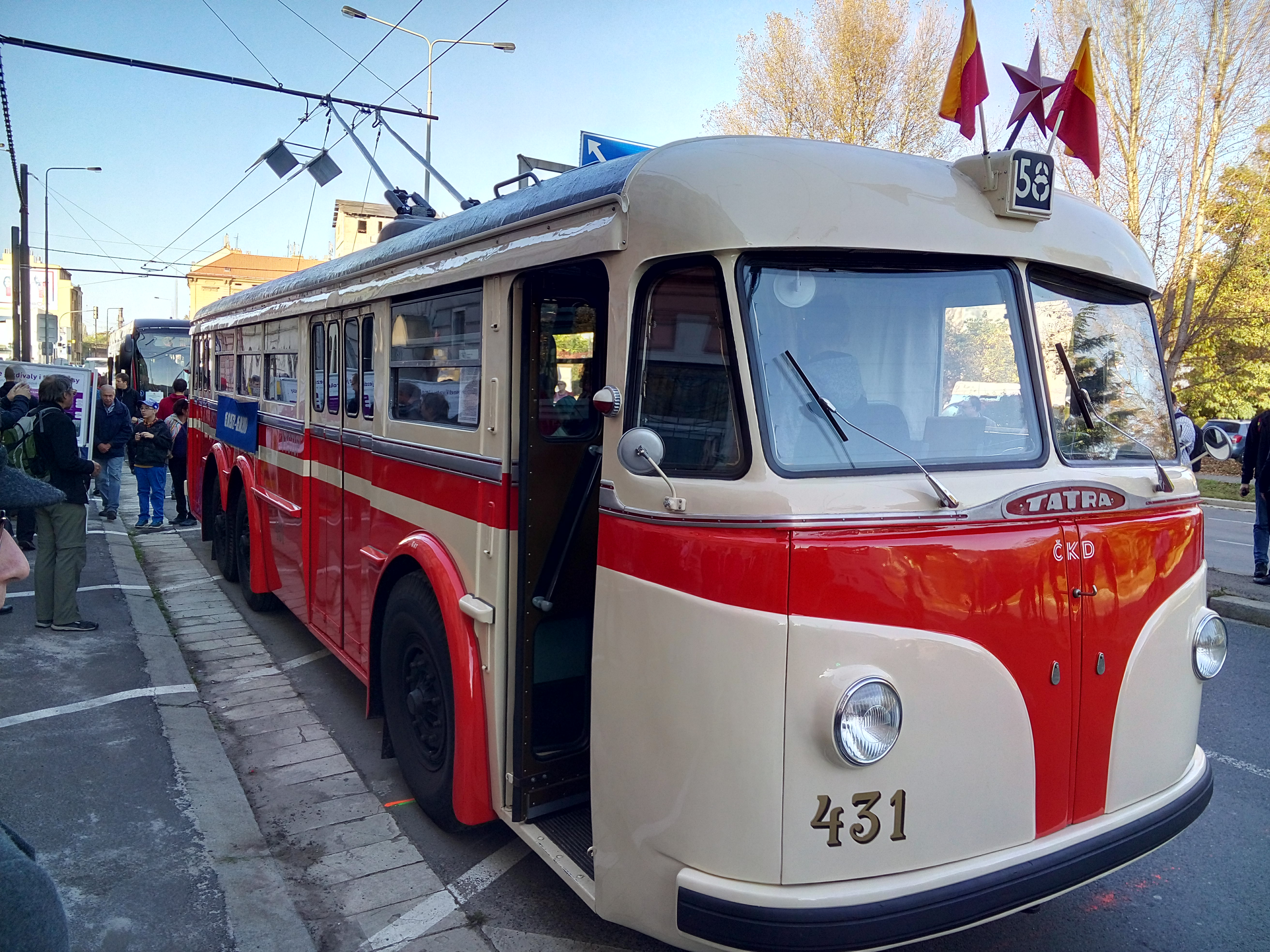
Preserved Tatra T400 trolleybus No. 431 in 2017, operating under its own power for the first time in 45 years

==== Opening ceremony ====
To commemorate 45 years since the last trolleybus operated in Prague, as well as the opening of the new line, apublic event was held on 15 October 2017, in which the new SOR TNB 12 trolleybus was used. It was accompanied by a new SOR ENS 12 electric bus and an historic Tatra T400 vehicle from the Prague's public transport museum collection. Spectators could see all three vehicles in operation, as well as take a free ride.

==== Regular operation ====
On 1 July 2018, Prague's Public Transport Company was to begin regular operation on a newly built line. The line will continue to have the number 58 and will follow the same route as in the preceding testing stage, that is, in between metro stations Palmovka and Letňany. Initially only 1 vehicle Škoda 30 Tr will be operated on the line running at 60-minute intervals.

==== One year of operation anniversary ====
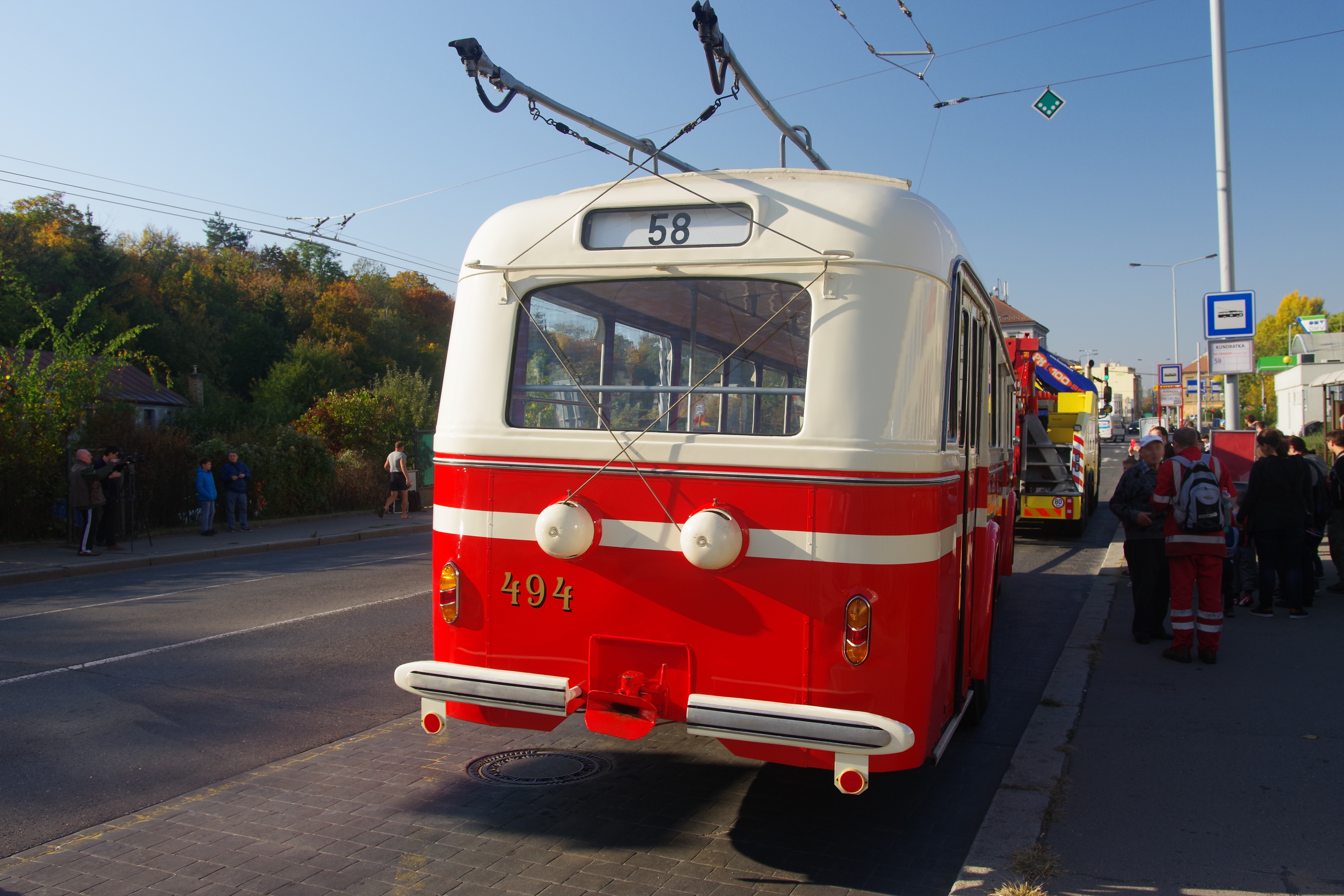
Škoda 8Tr towed away at the end of the special ride down the hill.

On 14 October 2018, a second event since the opening of the new trolleybus system was organised. It took place in order to commemorate both the 46th anniversary of the trolleybus system shutdown in Prague, as well as to celebrate the anniversary of the current system. Unlike the opening ceremony in 2017, rides on an historic vehicle were not continuous but took place only five times. Visitors who wanted to take a ride also needed to purchase tickets when entering the vehicle. Each trip cost 35 CZK per person, but small children were free if accompanied by an adult. The historic vehicle was a smaller Škoda 8Tr, and only about 40 people were allowed to travel at a time. Every paying passenger was given a stamped paper ticket, and a postcard with a picture of Škoda 8Tr when it was still in regular operation.

Each ride started at the bottom of the hill, near the Kundratka stop, right at the beginning of the wired section, then took approximately a kilometre up the hill. Passengers were required to leave the vehicle at the Kelerka stop at the end of the wired section. The trolleybus was then towed using a tractor all the way to Letňany roundabout, supposedly the nearest safe place to turn the towed trolleybus, and back to the Kelerka stop to take passengers back to the bottom section of the line at the Kundratka stop. Škoda 8Tr was then towed again to allow for a new ride up. Every round trip took approximately 20 minutes, but only a small portion of it consisted of the actual ride, with about 15 minutes being required for the off-wire manoeuvres. People who didn't take the ride stood around the wired section to have a look and take photos and videos of the running attraction.

Ride on the Škoda 30 Tr trolleybus in Prague.

==== Fleet ====
| Vehicle type | Count | In operation | Note | Image |
|---|---|---|---|---|
| SOR TNB 12 AcuMario | 1 | 9 October 2017 – 27 May 2018 | Borrowed on 9 October 2017, for the period of one year. This vehicle is a prototype as it is equipped with additional batteries. The electric components were manufactured by Rail Electronics CZ. | |
| Škoda 30Tr | 1 | 17 April 2018 – 12 November 2019 | Borrowed on 17 April 2018, for the period of one year. This period was however later extended to November 2019. This vehicle is a prototype as it is equipped with additional batteries. The electric components were manufactured by Škoda Electric. | |
| Škoda 27Tr | 1 | 25 March 2019 – 14 April 2019 | This vehicle is in ownership of the public transport company in Plzeň. Although belonging to public transport company in Plzeň and testing being done in Prague, it was loaned to Škoda Electric instead of the public transport company in Prague. Škoda borrowed the vehicle for a short period of time (from 24 March 2019 to 15 April 2019) to test an articulated trolleybus vehicle in Prague's conditions. The total cost Škoda has to pay for this is 75 000 Kč in total (without VAT). It was a completely new vehicle no more than a week old when sent to Prague. Škoda 27Tr is the first articulated trolleybus ever operating in Prague. | |
| Ekova Electron 12T | 1 | 24 September 2019 – 19 March 2020 | Vehicle borrowed for one month from the Public transport company in Ostrava. Thanks to an updated contract this vehicle stayed in Prague until March 2020 (although not in operation some days in February 2020 due to technical issues), leaving the whole trolleybus line 58 suspended with no vehicles running it after that point. | |
| Škoda 24Tr | 1 | In Prague from 21 May 2020 | This is the first trolleybus actually bought by the Prague Public Transport company after 60 years. It is however not a new vehicle but a second hand Škoda 24Tr from Plzeň (built in 2005) that is to be used as a service vehicle and for driver training. | Prague's first ever purchased trolleybus since 1960. |
| Škoda 36Tr | 1 | In Prague from 15 March 2023 | Prototype borrowed from the manufacturer. | |
| SOR TNS 18 | 15 | Tested since 30 August 2023 | These are the first new trolleybuses purchased for the renewed trolleybus system, aimed for operation on line 58, that has fully replaced bus line 140 starting from 1 February 2024. | First Prague's new trolleybuses for regular operation on line 58 (taking over previous bus line 140) |
| Škoda-Solaris 24m | 20 | Tested since 30 October 2023 (on line 58 as electrification of line 59 has not been completed at the time of testing) | A second batch of trolleybuses for the Prague's trolleybus system. These are aimed for the trolleybus line 59, replacing current bus line 119 and increasing the passenger capacity before a higher capacity train line is built. | Bi-articulated trolleybus for the airport line 59. |

==== Initial stage testing results ====
On 11 April 2021, Prague's public transport company announced the extension of the existing 1 km-long wired network. The plan war to replace all buses on line 140 connecting stations Palmovka and Miškovice by 2021. That was later delayed by one year to 2022. The final wired network won't cover the whole line but only a selected sections which is why Prague's public transport company now inquires 15 articulated trolleybuses equipped with batteries.

Based on the results from the testing done in between October 2017 and April 2018, it was also requested the new buses to operate the route 140 should be able to charge their batteries faster, that they should have a better acceleration running off wires on steep hills, and they should also be able to charge statically in depots.

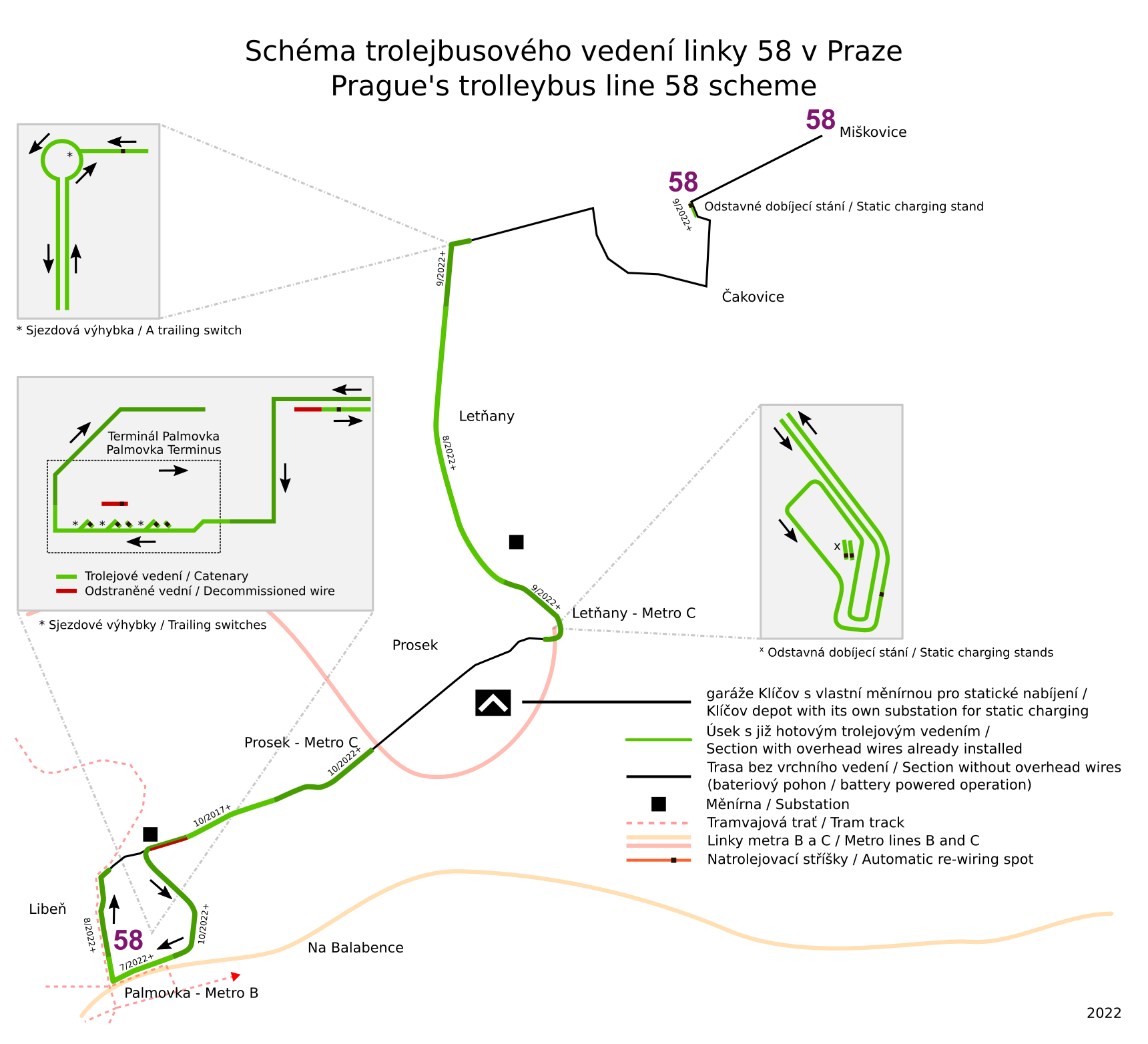
Palmovka - Miškovice electrification plan

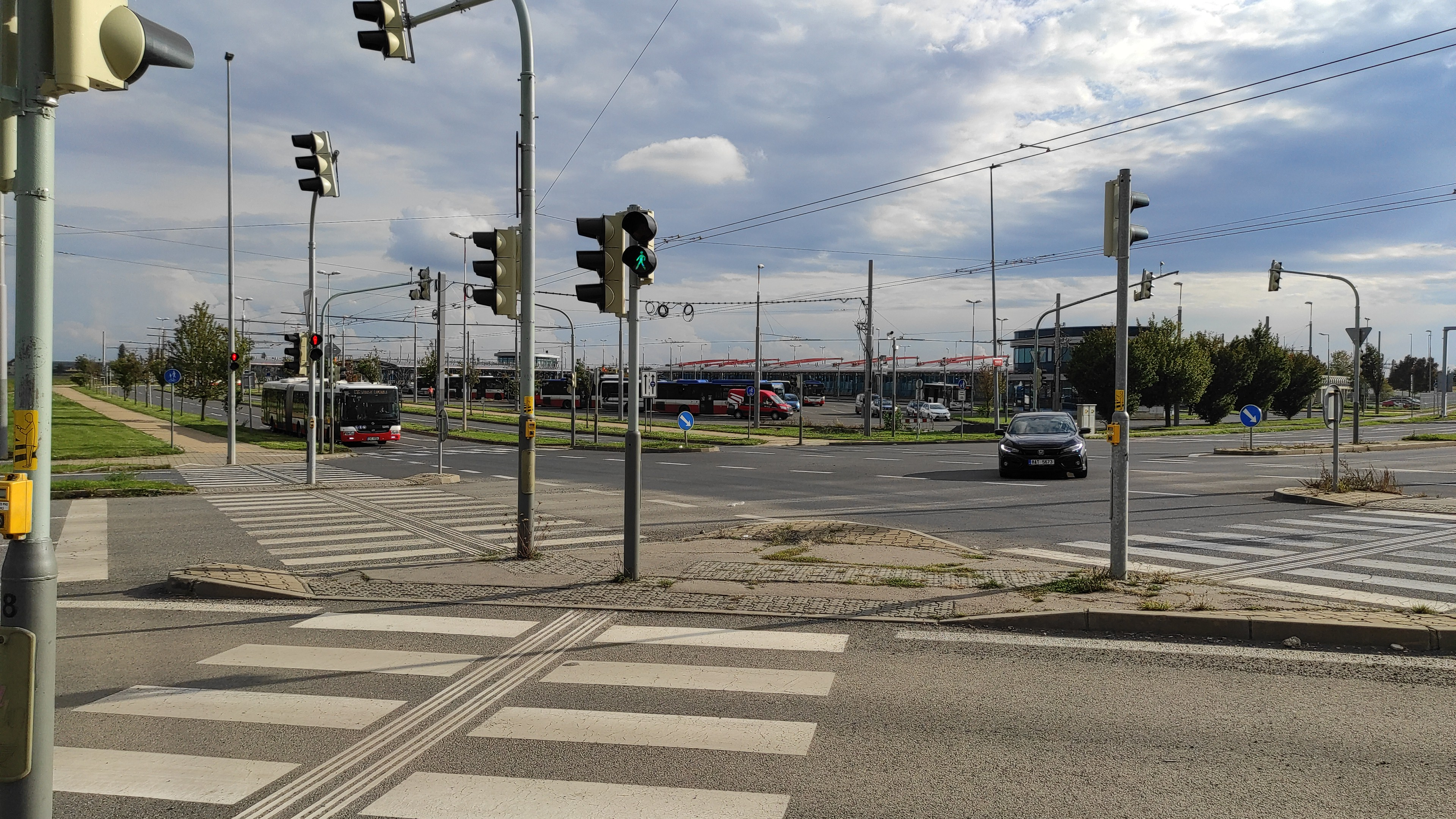
Letňany Terminal

==== Electrification of the Palmovka - Čakovice section ====
On 17 October 2018, the newspaper Pražský deník published an article on the current state of the trolleybus network extension plans mentioned in Initial stage testing results above. It was expected the wired sections would be built in 2020-21 and construction would take approximately 12 months. Approximately half of the bus line 140 was projected to be wired (8 km).

However a construction permit was only issued at the end of February 2021 so the work on the line (two individual sections) began on 10 January 2022, which has been merged with a reconstruction of Prosecká Street in the first quarter of 2021 as well as bus stop reconstructions on Tupolevova street slightly later that year.

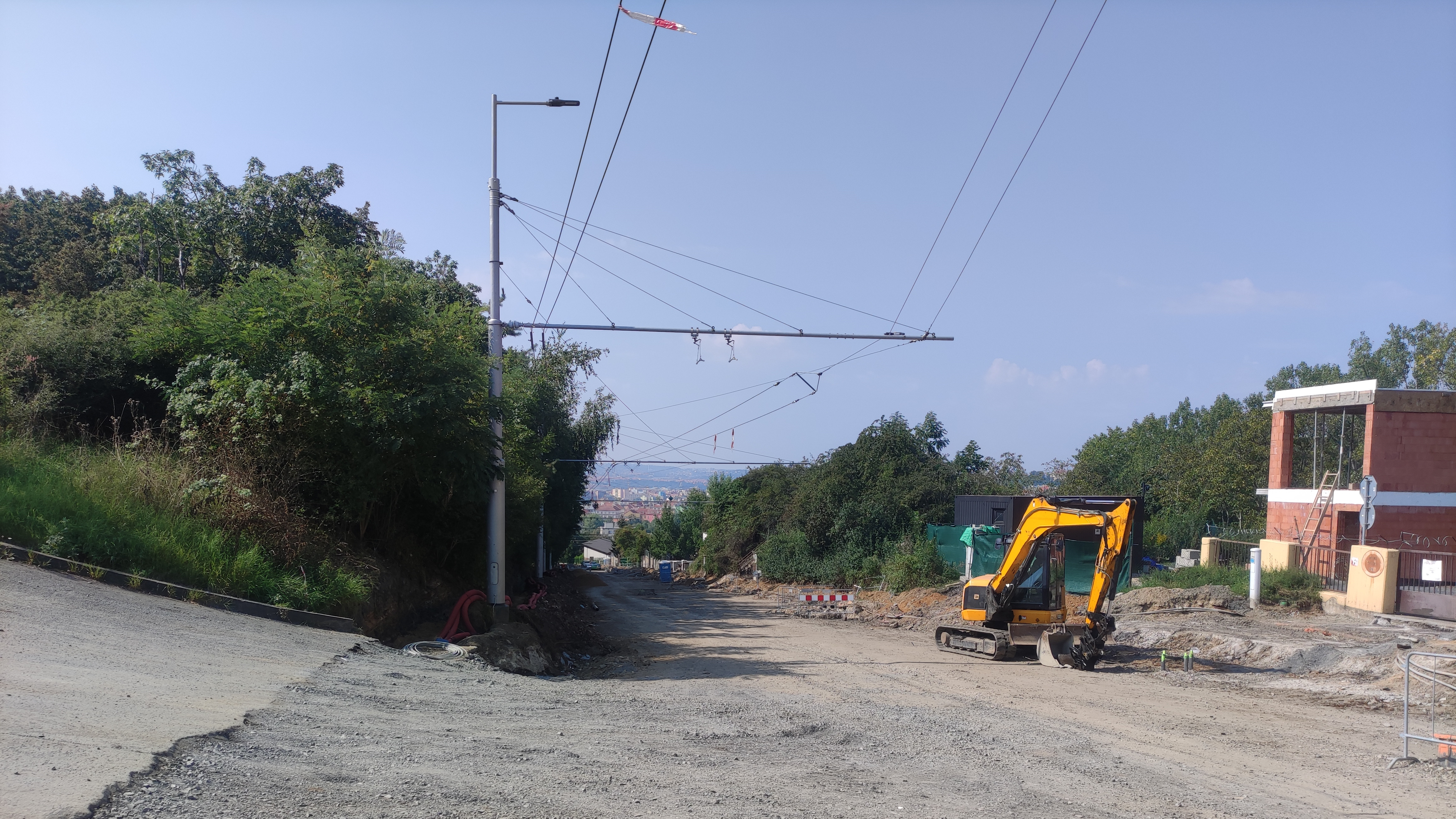
Prosecká street during reconstruction in September 2021 preceding trolleybus centenary extension in 2022

Overall, three substations will be provided to enable operations on the line, two to power the line itself and one for static vehicle charging in the Klíčov depot. Interestingly, a substation in Letňany is an abandoned substation originally used by trolleybuses. The other one had already been built during the initial testing and is being upgraded to allow full operation. So in the end the only new substation is built right for the operation of line 58 is the one in Klíčov depot.

Overview of the Prague's airport trolleybus line proposal.

==== Decision on Nádraží Veleslavín - Airport section electrification ====
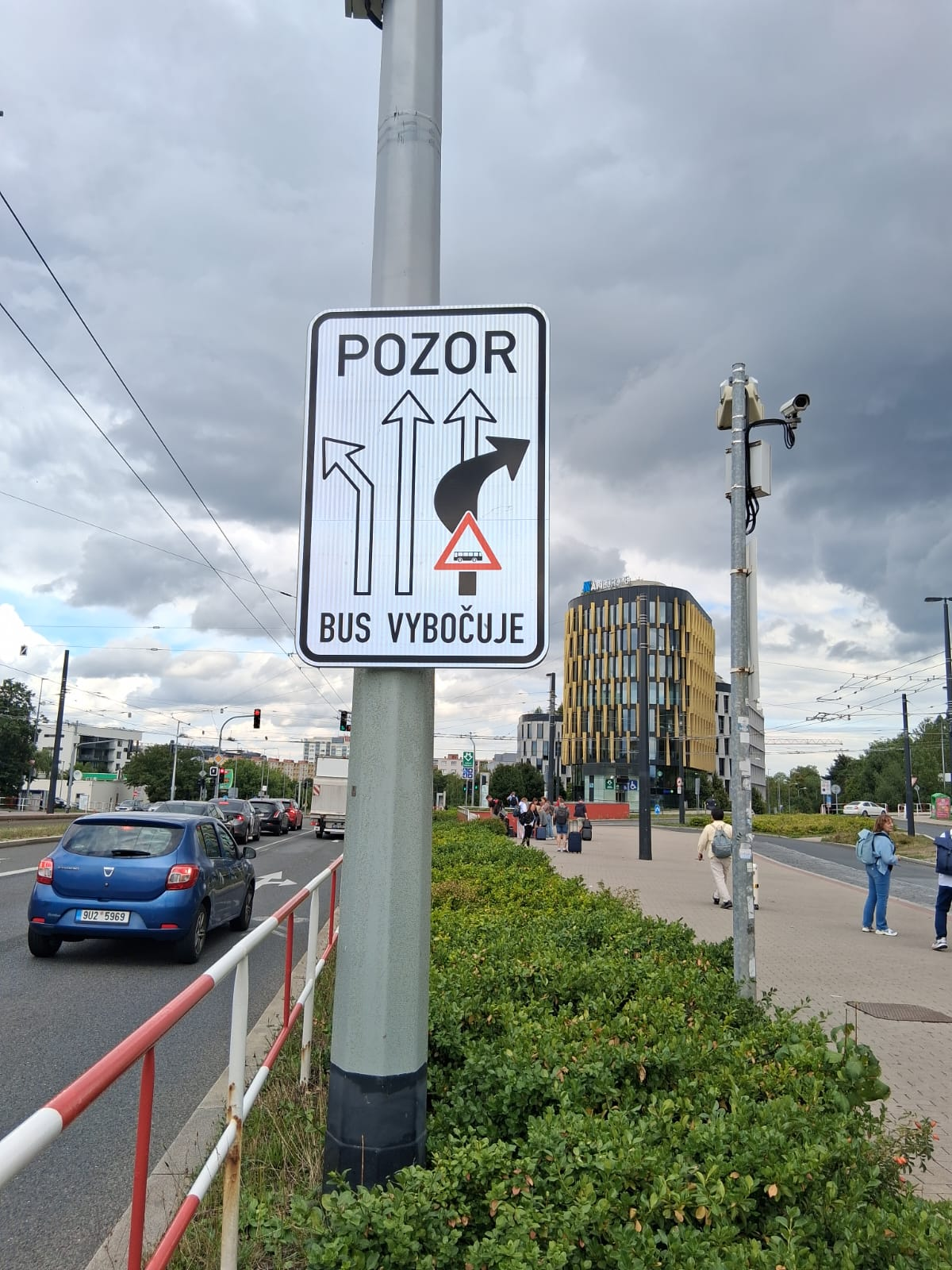
Road sign on Evropská street near Veleslavín metro station

On 16 September 2019, information was released about three new lines to be run by trolleybuses with additional batteries, on the other side of Prague (left bank of the Vltava river), utilizing a different depot in Řepy district. Work should start on electrifying bus line 119 connecting Prague with its main airport. Included should be charging station in Řepy depot (also usable for subsequent lines), in the Veleslavín subway/train/bus interchange station, and another at the Prague's International Airport, plus 4.8 km-long section with overhead wires between Veleslavín and intermediate bus stop Terminal 3.

Two other routes, 131 and 191, should follow once the work on the airport line is finished in 2023.

Line 119 is to be operated by high-capacity double-articulated trolleybuses, with higher capacity than current regular articulated buses. In total, 20 trolleybuses are supposed to be purchased for line 119, costing around 600 million CZK, while the wiring and depot preparation should only take half the sum.

==== Decision on replacing bus routes 131, 137, 176 and 191 with trolleybus routes ====
On 8 June 2020, the Prague City Council approved electrification of lines 131, 137, 176 and 191. The construction of the necessary infrastructure should begin after lines 140 (Palmovka - Čakovice) and 119 (Nádraží Veleslavín - Airport) are finished, as was announced when line 119 was approved. This project is a logical step to follow after the conversion of line 119 considering line 191 can use part of that infrastructure. On top of that line 176 will also share a section of the catenary with line 191. Then all the additional lines will be built close to each other on the same bank of the Vltava river which also means a single depot will be able to serve them all and some power substations can power up multiple nearby sections. In addition all 4 lines are passing through steep and/or long inclines which are well suited for a trolleybus operation. It is also interesting all lines except 191 were already operated by trolleybuses in the Prague's first trolleybus system epoch. Price to electrify the 4 new trolleybus lines is estimated to be in between 1 and 1.3 billion CZK in total.

As with the preceding projects, the trolleybuses on these routes will operate partially under wires and partially using batteries:

- Line 131 (Bořislavka – Hradčanská), catenary to be installed on 61% of the route (3.8 km).
  - This line should cost around 200 million CZK.
- Line 137 (Na Knížecí – U Waltrovky), catenary to be installed on 95% of the route (3.2 km). However, some buses continue from U Waltrovky up to a quite distant stop Malá Ohrada.
  - This line should cost around 220 million CZK.
- Line 176 (Stadion Strahov – Karlovo náměstí), catenary to be installed on 71% of the route (4 km). This line will share some infrastructure with line 119.
  - This line should cost around 320 million CZK.
- Line 191 (Na Knížecí – Ciolkovského – Letiště Václava Havla Praha), catenary will be installed in three separate sections (also utilizing infrastructure for line 119). The total coverage of wired power supply should be 55% of the route (15.3 km).
  - This line should cost around 580 million CZK.

An additional 130 million CZK will be used to prepare the Řepy depot for trolleybus expansion. Construction should be completed by 2025.

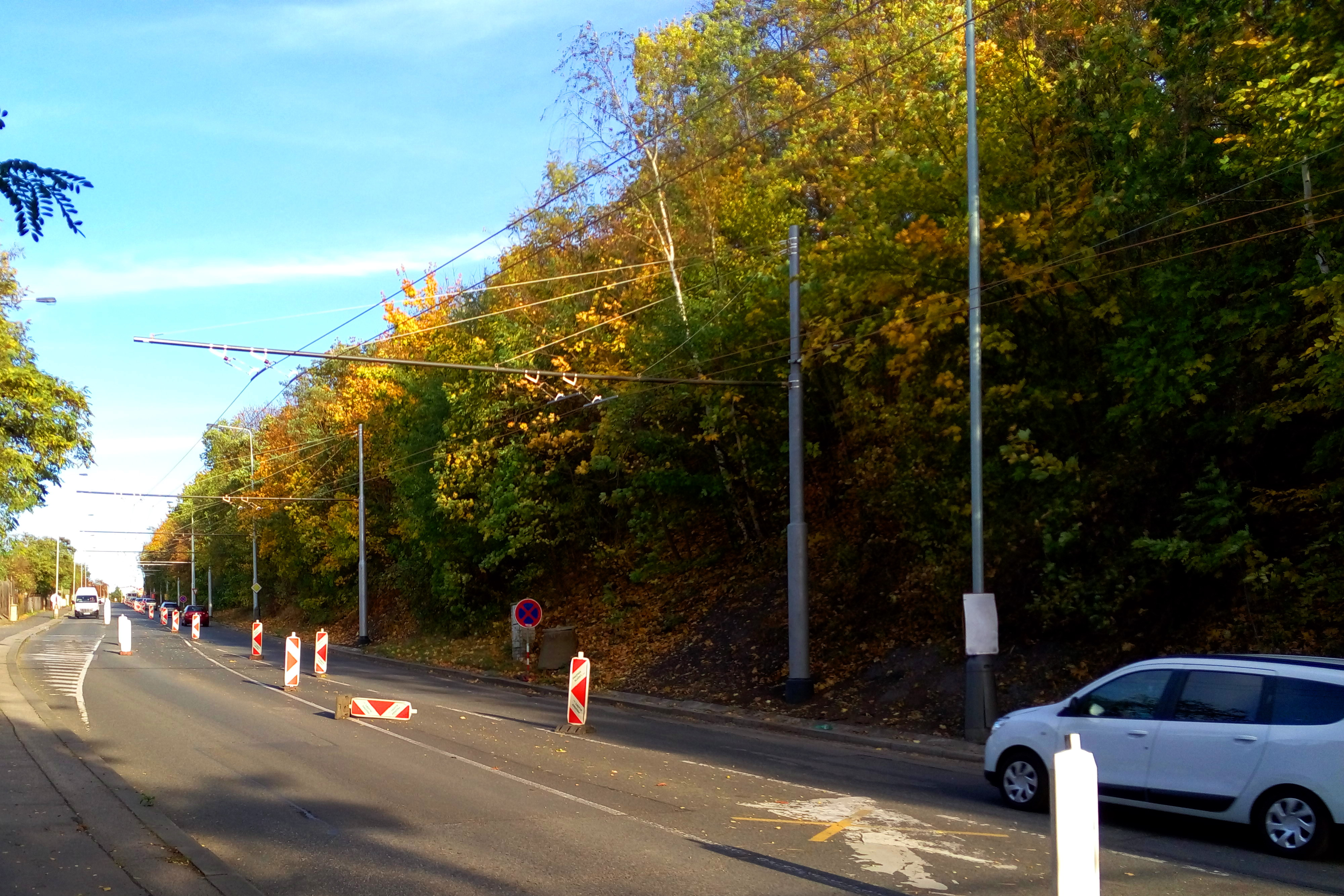
A section of the new trolleybus line along Prosecká ulice (Prosecká Street) a few days before the opening of the new system

== Future outlook ==
Even though the current trolleybus network is small, if testing is successful it could begin to grow in the next few years. Trolleybuses have strong support from within the public transport company, city major as well as public based on being both clean and efficient. The wired section of the current trolleybus system, while not covering the full length of the line, helps recharge batteries while the vehicle is in operation, which reduces the need for heavier high-capacity batteries. Therefore, less energy is consumed and batteries can occupy much less space in the vehicle. That is also the reason for the wired section of the trolleybus system being on the steep, hilly section, where battery consumption is enormous in comparison to operation on flat ground.
