= Transport in Prague =

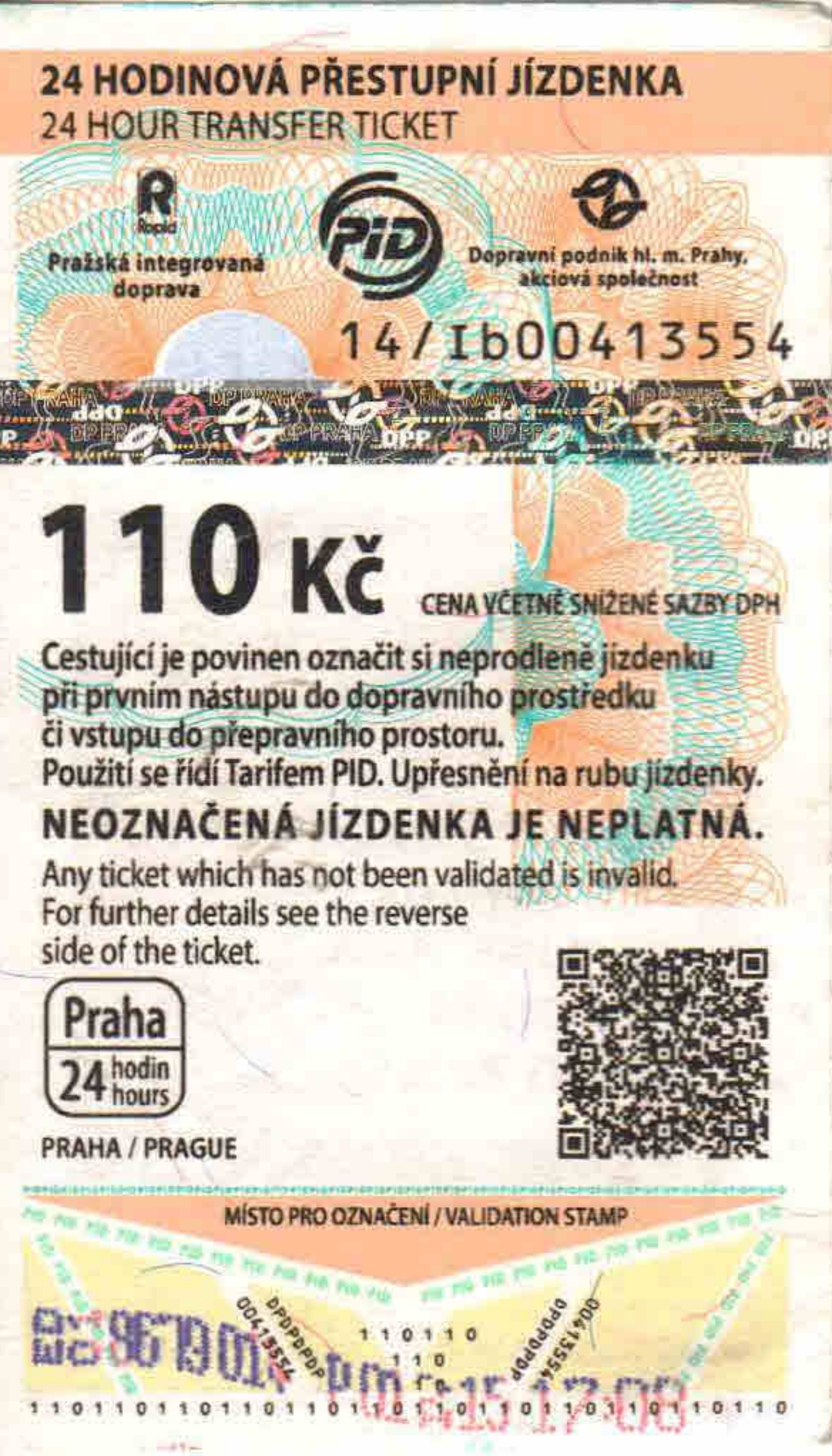
- Typical transfer ticket in Prague

Overview
- Locale: Prague and Central Bohemian Region
- Transit type: Rapid transit, commuter rail, light metro, light rail, buses, private automobile, Taxicab, bicycle, pedestrian

Prague has an extensive and developed transport network which includes both public and private services. As of 2017, Prague's transport modal share by journey was 52% public transport, 24.5% by car, 22.4% on foot, 0.4% by bicycle and 0.5% by aeroplane.

Public transport services are dominated by the city's executive agency for transport, Prague Public Transit Company (DPP). DPP controls the majority of public transport, including the metro, buses, trams, the funicular, trolleybuses and selected ferry services.

== Public transportation ==
The public transport infrastructure is under the control of Prague Integrated Transport (PID, Pražská integrovaná doprava) system, consisting of the Prague Metro (lines A, B, and C, its length is 65 km (40 mi) with 61 stations in total), Prague tram system, Prague bus service, commuter trains, a funicular, and seven ferries. Prague has one of the highest rates of public transport usage in the world, with 1.2 billion passenger journeys per year.

=== Prague Metro ===
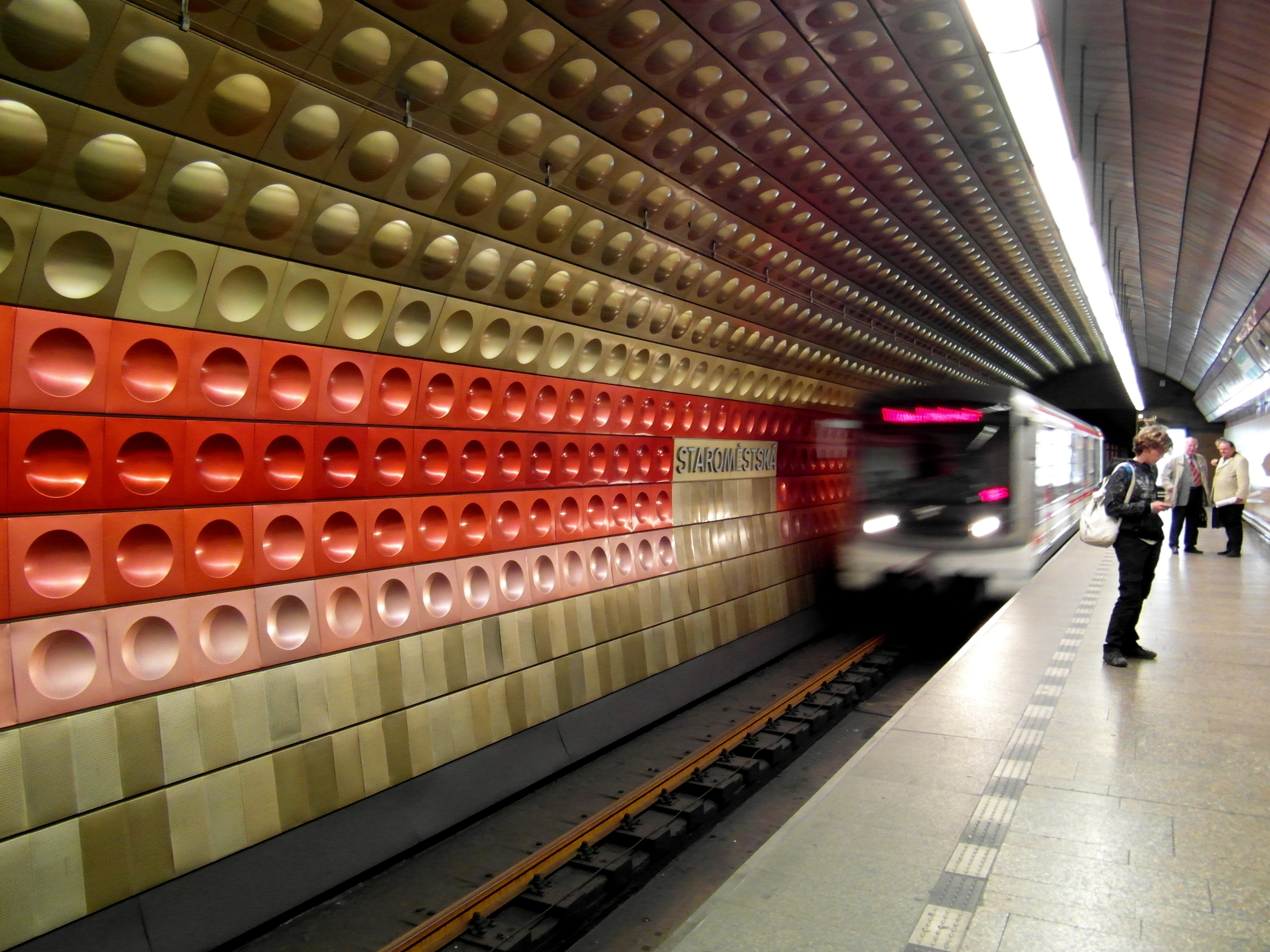
Staroměstská metro station of Prague Metro

The Metro has three major lines extending throughout the city: A (green), B (yellow) and C (red). A fourth Metro line D is under construction, which will connect the city centre to southern parts of the city (as of 2025, the completion is expected in 2031). The Prague Metro system served 589.2 million passengers in 2012, making it the fifth busiest metro system in Europe and the most-patronised in the world on a per capita basis. The first section of the Prague metro was put into operation in 1974, on the stretch between stations Kačerov and Florenc on the current line C. The first part of Line A was opened in 1978 (Dejvická – Náměstí Míru), the first part of line B in 1985 (Anděl – Florenc).

In April 2015, construction finished to extend the green line A further into the northwest corner of Prague, closer to the airport. A new interchange station for the bus in the direction of the airport is the station Nádraží Veleslavín. The final station of the green line is Nemocnice Motol (Motol Hospital), giving people direct public transportation access to the largest medical facility in the Czech Republic.

In operation there are two kinds of units: "81-71M" which is modernized variant of the Soviet Metrovagonmash 81-71 (completely modernized between 1995 and 2003) and new "Metro M1" trains (since 2000), manufactured by consortium consisting of Siemens, ČKD Praha and ADtranz. The minimum interval between two trains is 90 seconds.

The original Soviet "Ečs" vehicles were excluded in 1997, but one vehicle is placed in public transport museum in depot Střešovice. The Náměstí Míru metro station is the deepest station and is equipped with the longest escalator in European Union.

=== Buses ===
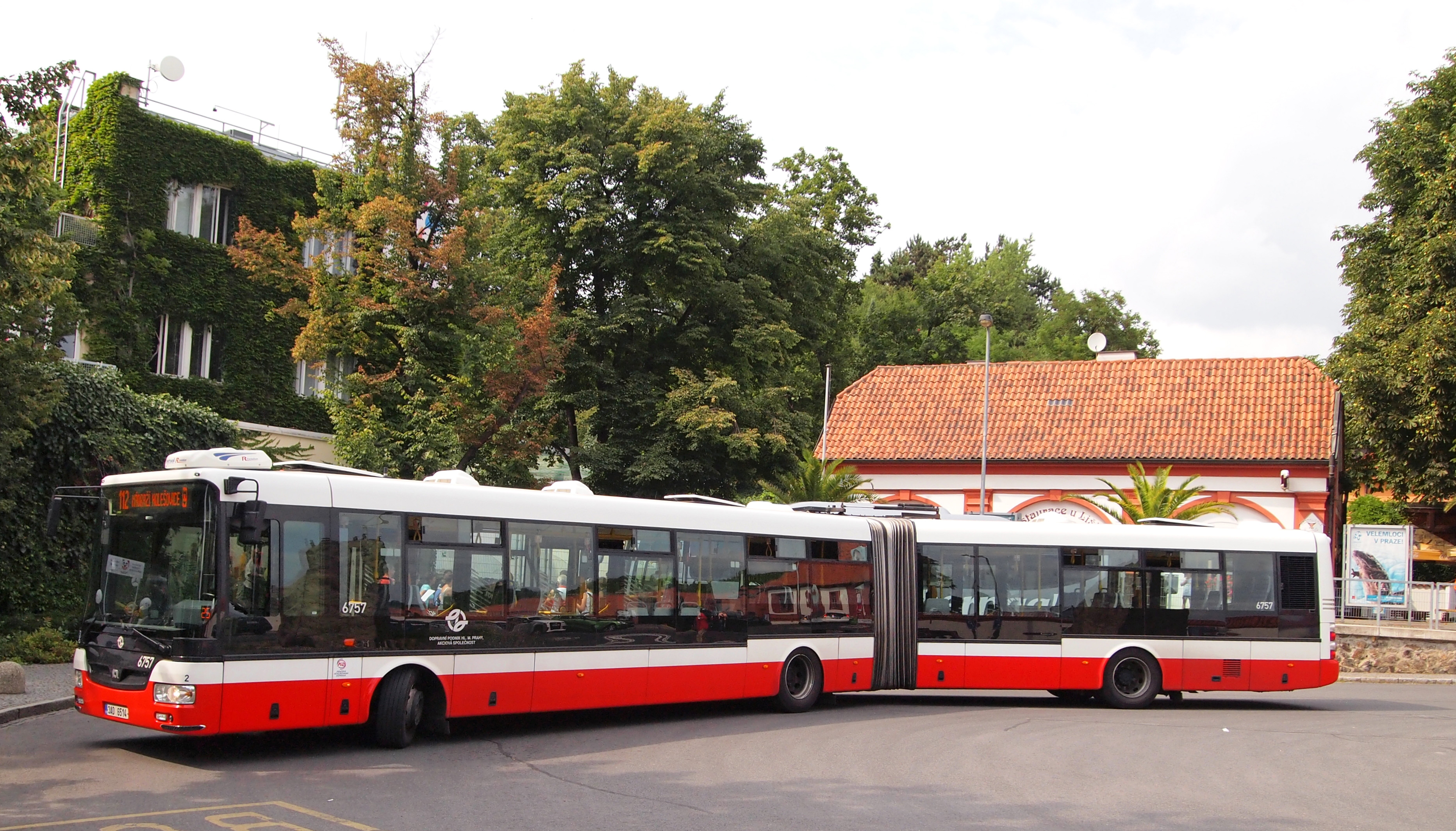
SOR NB 18 of the Prague bus service next to the Prague Zoo

Buses fulfil many different roles in Prague's public transport system. Many lines serve as connections between the metro, tram, and rail systems and outlying residential areas. Services are run by the Prague Public Transport Company and several other private operators on suburban connections outside of Prague.

Prague has about 300 bus lines (numbers 100–963). The public transport system operator DPP uses a mix of over 1,200 buses and 37 trolleybuses which are all low-floor, single-deck, and sometimes articulated. Buses such as Solaris Urbino, SOR, Škoda and Iveco Bus operate on the routes. Since 2020, all local bus services are operated by modern low-floor buses.

After precisely 45 years since the old trolleybus system closed, a new trolleybus system was opened in Prague in 2023.

=== Intercity buses ===
The main stations of long-distance buses are Černý Most, Zličín and Florenc; the latter which is served by FlixBus.

=== Trams ===
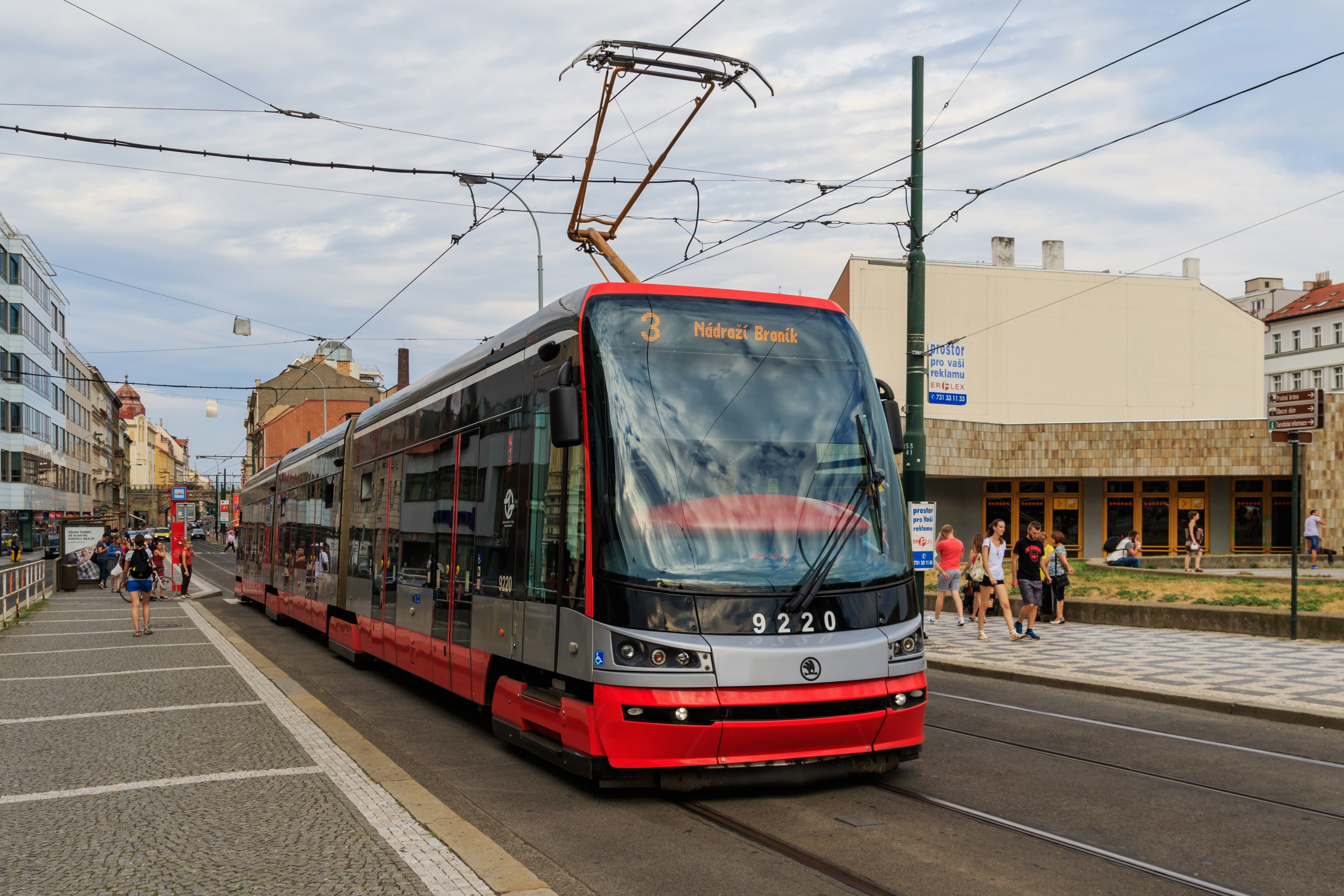
Škoda 15 T, tram of the Prague tram system

Prague has 34 regular tram lines (numbers 1–26, 31 and night trams numbered 91–99). The Prague tram system is the twelfth longest in the world (144 km) and its rolling stock consists of 786 individual cars which is the largest in the world. The system carries more than 360 million passengers annually, the highest tram patronage in the world after Budapest. On a per capita basis, Prague has the second-highest tram patronage after Zürich.

The Prague tram system now operates various types of trams, including Tatra KT8D5, Škoda 14 T (designed by Porsche), newer modern low-floor electric Škoda 15 T and Škoda 52 T trams and Tatra T3 on nostalgic tram lines 23 and 41. Around 400 vehicles are the modernized T3 class, which are typically operated coupled together in pairs.

=== Funiculars ===
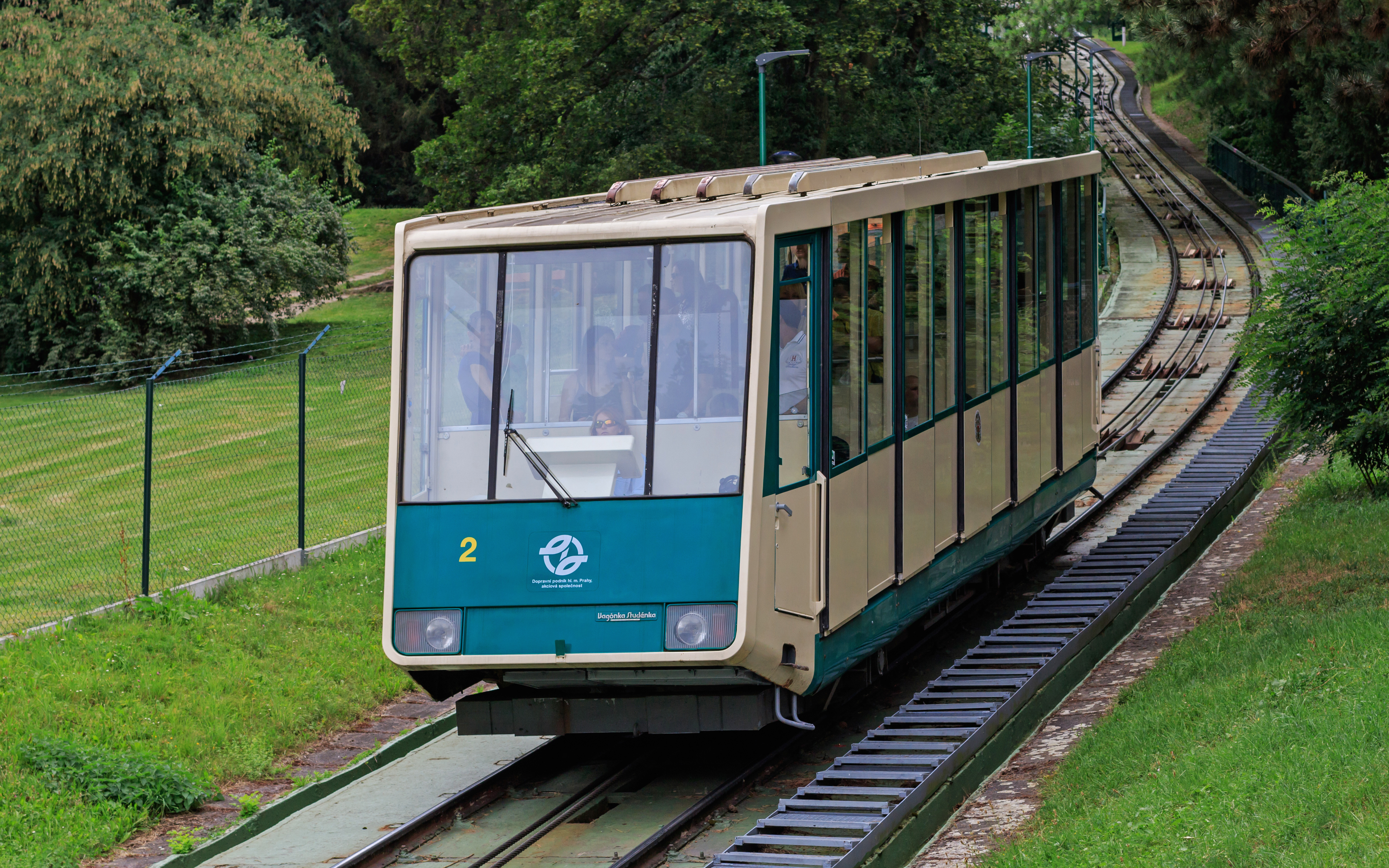
Petřín funicular

Petřín funicular links the Malá Strana district with the top of Petřín (Czech pronunciation: [ˈpɛtr̝̊iːn]) hill. The funicular has three stops: Újezd (at the bottom of the hill), Nebozízek (the middle station) and Petřín (at the top of the hill). The funicular operates daily from 9 am to 11:30 pm, with the interval being between 15 and 20 minutes.

There are also two other funiculars in Prague, not operated by the PID.

=== Ferries ===
Since 2005, the Regional Organiser of Prague Integrated Transport (ROPID) has franchised the operation of ferries on the Vltava river, which are also a part of the public transport system with common fares.

=== Taxis ===
Taxi services make pick-ups on the streets or operate from regulated taxi stands, most notably, Pařížská Street in the city centre of Prague. Taxi reputation in Prague is somewhat varied – there are examples of taxi drivers who target tourists with dishonest fare practices.. Uber operates in Prague.

=== Ticketing ===
All services (metro, tramways, city buses, funiculars, and ferries) have a common ticketing system that operates on a proof-of-payment system. Basic transfer tickets can be bought for 30 and 90-minute rides. Short-term tourist passes are available for periods of 24 hours or 3 days, and longer-term tickets can be bought on the smart ticketing system Lítačka, for periods of one month, three months, or one year. Since August 2021, people up to the age of 14 and over 65 can use Prague's public transport free of charge (proof of age is required). Persons between 15 and 18 years and between 60 and 64 years pay half price for single tickets and day tickets.

== Roads ==
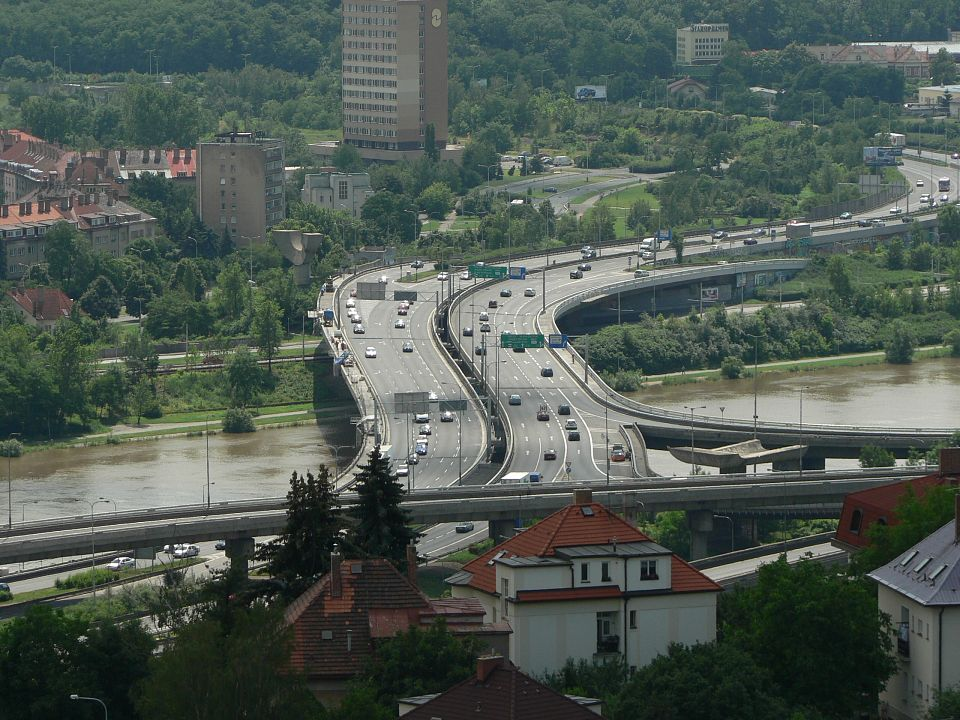
Barrandov Bridge, part of the Prague Inner Ring Road

Inner and outer ring roads serve as the main flow of traffic leading through the centre of the city, and around its perimeter. The MO runs through the city, whilst parts of the Outer Ring Road connect with the D1 motorway to Brno and Ostrava to the Polish border, and the D5 motorway that runs via Plzeň to the German border.

The Inner Ring Road (The City Ring "MO") cuts through central Prague. It is the longest city tunnel in Europe with a length of 5.5 km (3.4 mi), and five interchanges have been completed to relieve congestion in the north-western part of Prague. Called Blanka tunnel complex and part of the City Ring Road, it was estimated to eventually cost (after several increases) CZK 43 billion. Construction started in 2007 and, after repeated delays, the tunnel officially opened in September 2015. This tunnel complex completes a major part of the inner ring road.

The Outer Ring Road will connect all major motorways and speedways that meet each other in the Prague region and provide faster transit without the necessity to drive through the city. So far 39 km (24 mi), out of a total planned 83 km (52 mi) is in operation. Most recently, the southern part of this road (with a length of more than 20 km (12 mi) was opened on 22 September 2010. As of 2021, the next 12 km (7 mi) section between Modletice and Běchovice is planned to be completed in 2025.

=== Bridges ===
Prague has 18 main bridges crossing the Vltava River, with the iconic 14th-century Charles Bridge being the most famous. Charles Bridge has a history of tram transport, however it is mainly used for pedestrian traffic today. Across the Vltava, tram and road traffic bridges include Svatopluk Čech Bridge, Mánes Bridge and Legion Bridge amongst many. Barrandov Bridge is the most used in the country at 136,000 vehicles crossing it daily.

== Rail ==
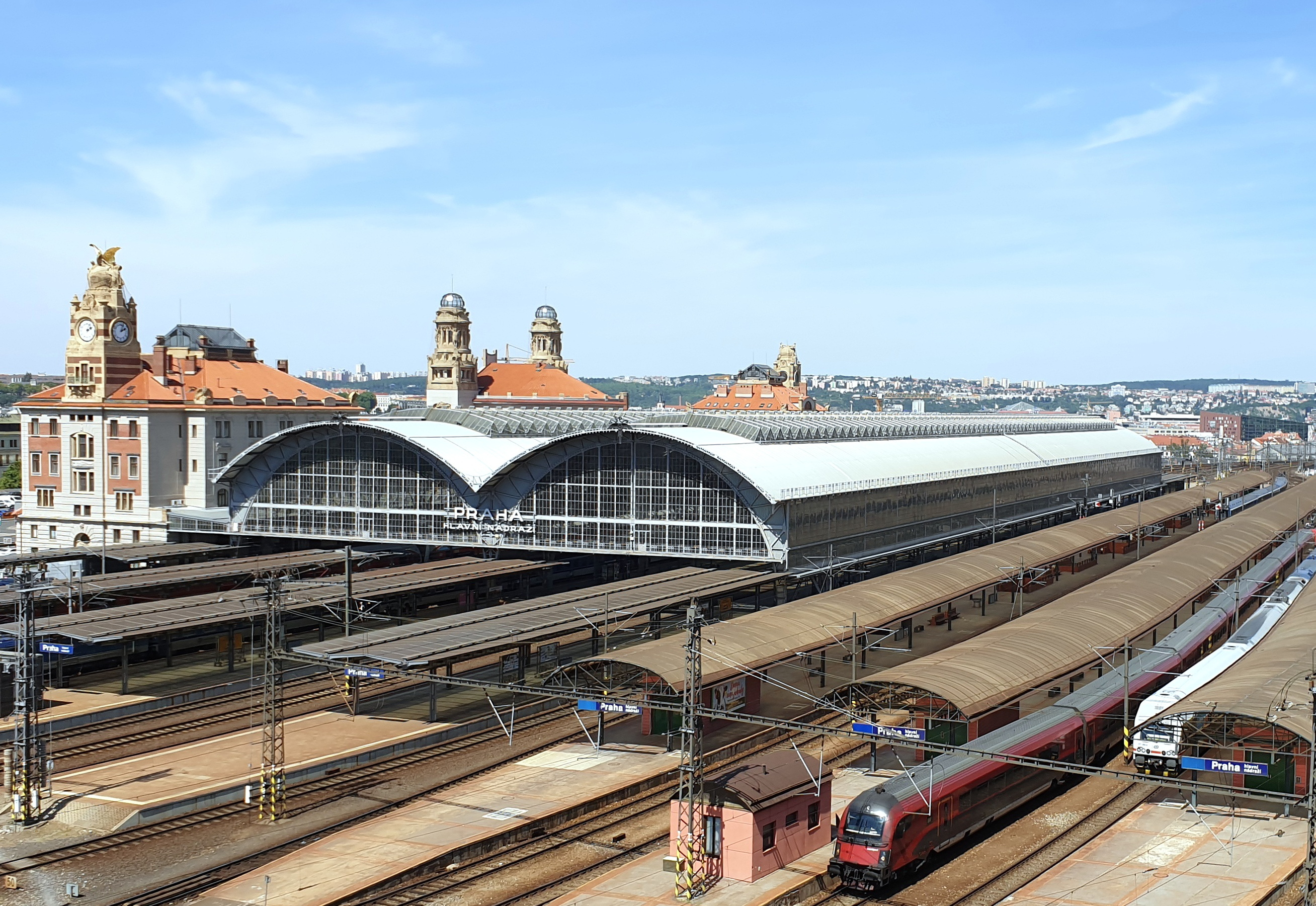
Prague main train station is the largest and busiest train station in the country.

Rail in Prague is mainly operated by the national carrier České dráhy, however domestic and international traffic is also carried by operators such as ÖBB and RegioJet.

The city forms the hub of the Czech railway system, with services to all parts of the country and abroad. The railway system links Prague with major European cities (which can be reached without transfers), including Dresden, Berlin, Hamburg, Leipzig, Regensburg and Munich (Germany); Vienna, Graz and Linz (Austria); Warsaw, Kraków, Przemyśl and Gdynia (Poland); Bratislava, Poprad and Košice (Slovakia); Budapest (Hungary); Basel and Zürich (Switzerland). Travel times range between 2 hours to Dresden and 13 hours to Zürich.

Prague's main international railway station is Hlavní nádraží. The station is connected to Prague Metro Line C and the Hlavní nádraží railway station. Rail services are also available from other main stations: Masarykovo nádraží, Holešovice and Smíchov, in addition to suburban stations. Commuter rail services operate under the name Esko Praha, which is part of PID (Prague Integrated Transport).

== Air ==
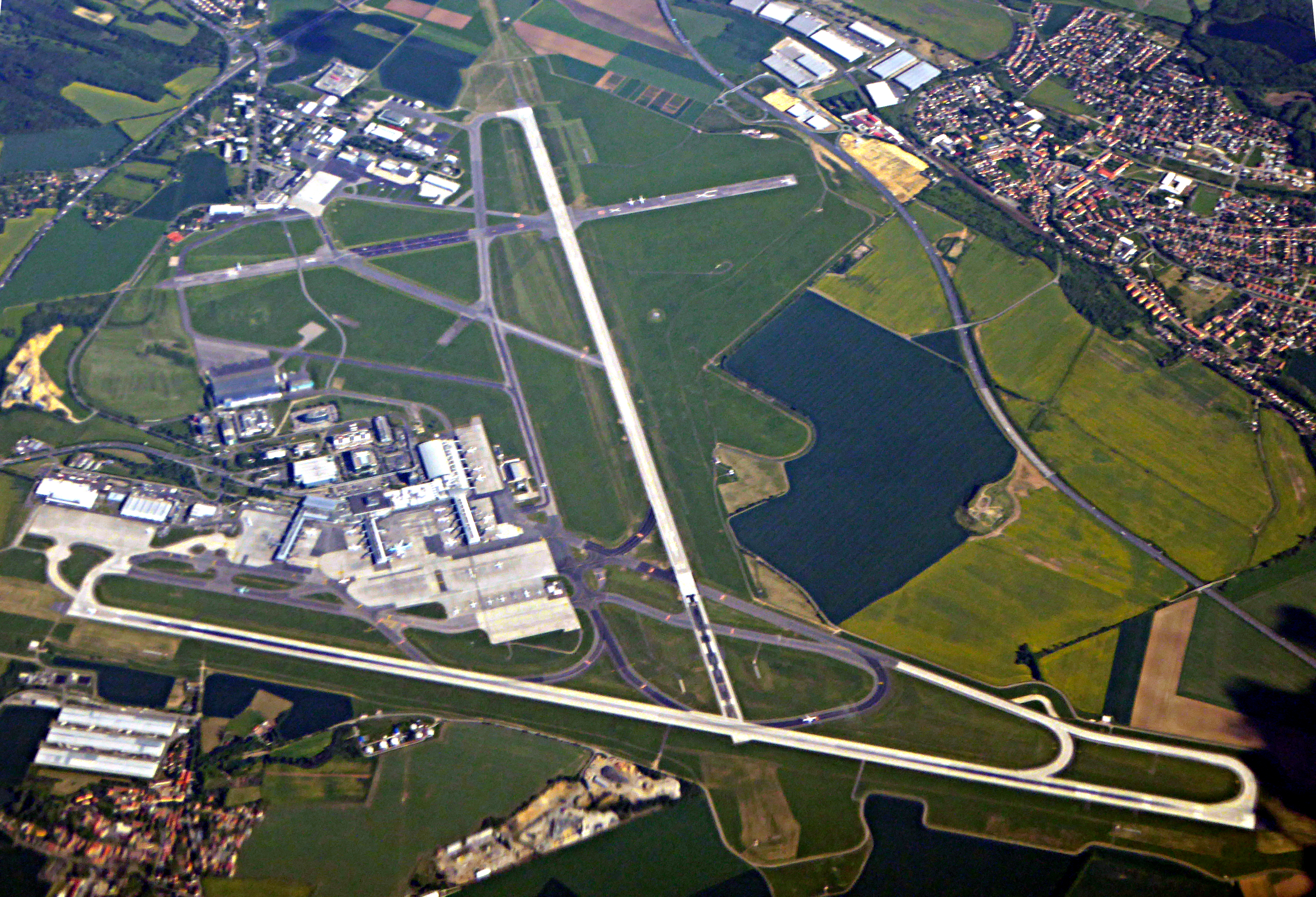
Václav Havel Airport Prague is one of the busiest airports in central Europe, carrying 16.8 million passengers in 2018.

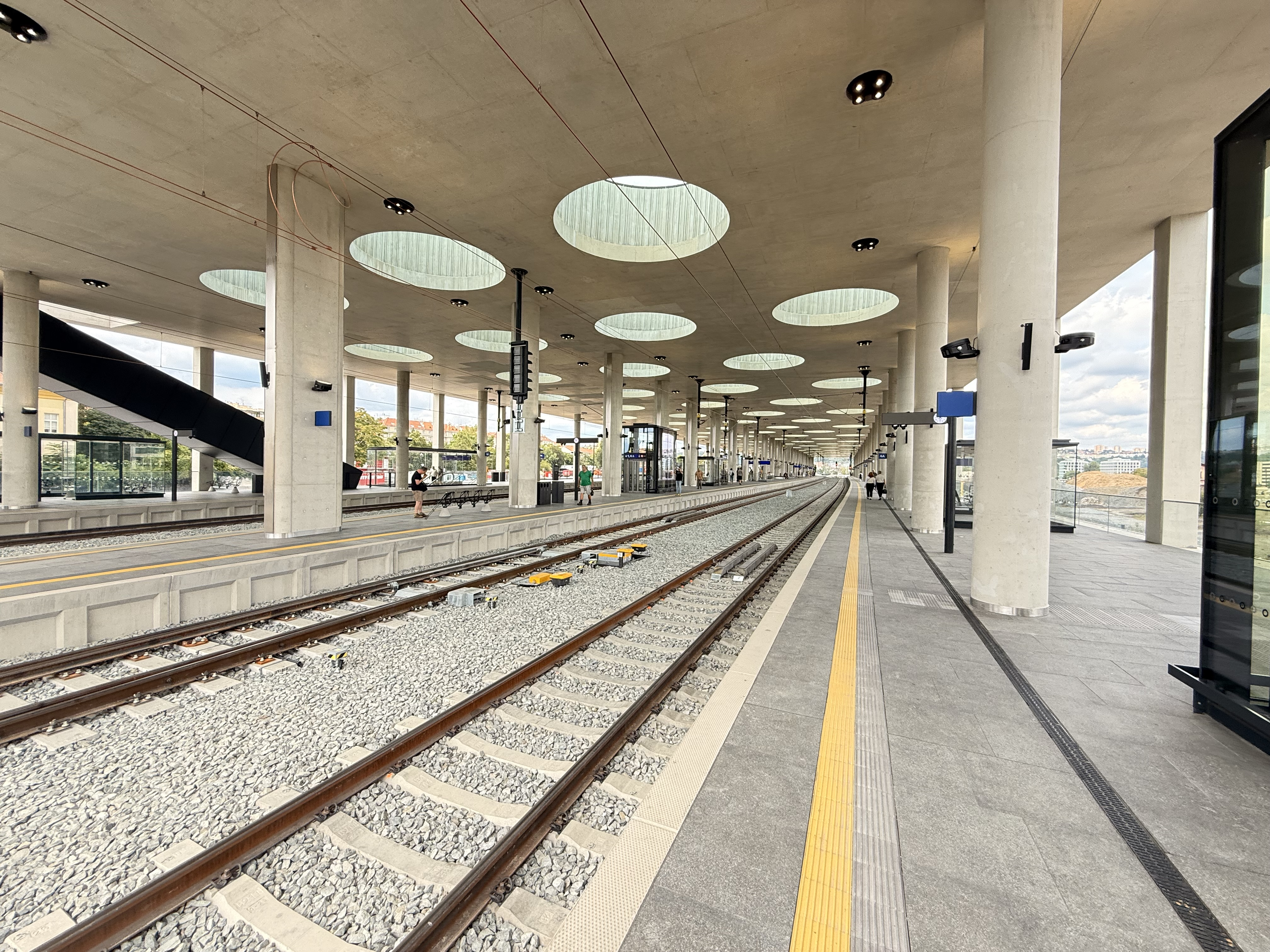
Praha-Bubny railway station was reconstructed in 2025, and is one of the first parts of the construction of the modernised railway leading to the airport.

Prague is served by Václav Havel Airport Prague, the largest airport in the Czech Republic and one of the largest and busiest airports in central and eastern Europe. In 2018, it served around 17 million passengers. It served as a hub for Czech Airlines until it ceased operations in late 2024 and it serves as a hub for Smartwings, and as an operating base for Ryanair and Eurowings. Outside of Prague, the closest airport is Pardubice; some 150km away.

Other airports in Prague include the city's original airport in the north-eastern district of Kbely, which is serviced by the Czech Air Force. It also houses the Prague Aviation Museum. The nearby Letňany Airport is mainly used for private aviation and aeroclub aviation. Another airport in the proximity is Aero Vodochody aircraft factory to the north, used for testing purposes, as well as for aeroclub aviation. There are a few aeroclubs around Prague, such as the Točná airfield.

The airport is served by line AE (airport express) which leaves Prague's main railway station every half an hour, and trolleybus line 59 which connects passengers to the metro at Nádraží Veleslavín.

=== Proposed airport rail connection ===
There are plans to build a rail connection to the airport. Preliminary work commenced in 2018, with procurement proceedings launched the following year. Main construction was expected to start around 2023, but as of 2025 construction had not yet begun.

According to a 2021 media report, the airport is to be served via a branch off the Prague-Kladno line, including an underground station to serve the airport. The project also includes double tracking and electrifying the existing single-track railway. The plan also includes upgrades to Prague-Masarykovo station, which began in 2024. The project is notable for being the first ever public-private partnership in Czech railway history, and is expected to be completed around 2030 at a cost of 28 billion crowns.

== Other ==
=== Cycling ===
In 2018, 1–2.5 % of people commute by bike in Prague, depending on the season. Cycling is very common as a sport or recreation. As of 2019, there were 194 km (121 mi) of protected cycle paths and routes. Also, there were 50 km (31 mi) of bike lanes and 26 km (16 mi) of specially marked bus lanes that are free to be used by cyclists. As of 2024, there are four companies providing bicycle sharing in Prague: Rekola (1,000 bikes), Nextbike (1,000 bikes), Bolt and Lime. Bikesharing is partially connected to the public transportation network and subsidised by the city.

=== Miscellaneous ===
After an international design competition, that concluded during late 2022, a new wayfinding system is being implemented in several phases across Prague, and its public transportation, called Legible Prague. Its goal is to make orientation simpler for locals and tourists.

== See also ==
- Prague Metro
- Trams in Prague
- Buses in Prague
- Cycling in Prague
- Trolleybuses in Prague
- Prague Integrated Transport
