= Signpost (disambiguation) =

A signpost is a post bearing a sign, most often referring to a traffic sign.

The Signpost, Signpost or Sign Post may also refer to:

== Media and literature ==
- The Signpost, online newspaper of the English Wikipedia since January 2005
- The Signpost (novel), a 1944 novel by E. Arnot Robertson
- The Signpost (Weber State University), a student newspaper

== Other uses ==
- Signpost (company), an American marketing automation company
- Sign Post, Virginia, an unincorporated community
