= Cycling in Prague =

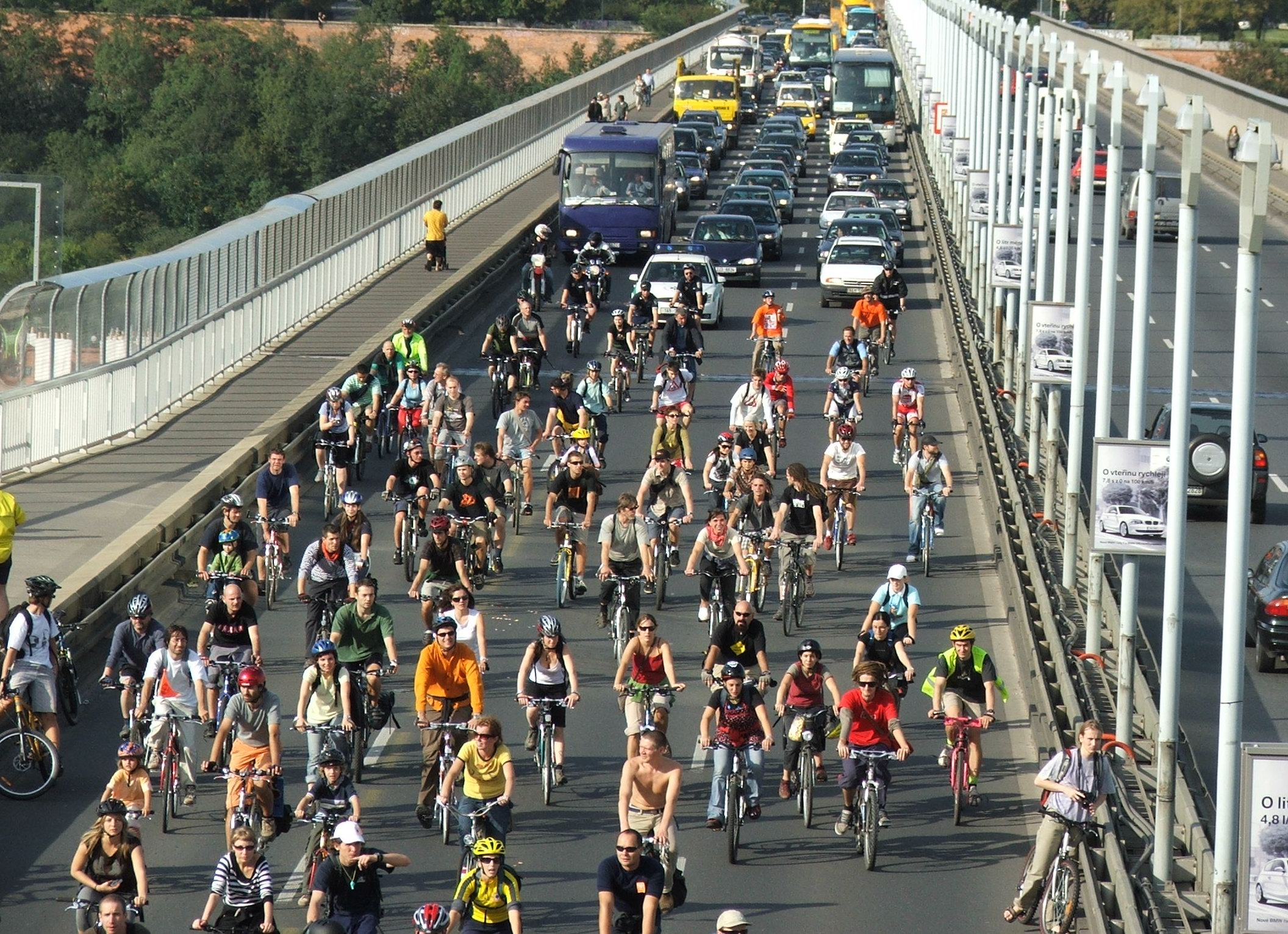
Critical mass cycling in Prague (Cyklojízda), 2007

Cycling in Prague is used for both transport and recreation in Prague, the capital of the Czech Republic. Cycling accounts for a relatively small share of journeys in the city, although Prague has gradually expanded its cycling infrastructure and incorporated cycling into its active-mobility and transport policies.

The city has about 550 km of marked cycling routes, comprising separated paths as well as various forms of on-street cycling infrastructure. Its citywide route network includes higher-level, backbone and main routes designated with A-numbers.

Bike sharing has also become integrated with the Prague Integrated Transport system, with short rides offered to eligible season-ticket holders through Lítačka.

== History ==
Early cycling infrastructure in Prague was limited. In 1956, raised cycle lanes were constructed along Letňanská Street in Letňany. In 1986, a cycling route intended primarily for recreational use was established in Stromovka.

Following the Velvet Revolution in 1989, recreational cycling became more widespread and the Czech Tourist Club began marking cycling routes in the city. An early mass bicycle ride was held in Prague in 1991, with around 80 participants. In 1993, the Prague City Council approved a plan to establish approximately 400 km of cycling routes by 2000, although less than half of the planned network had been completed by that date.

Cycling advocacy became increasingly organised during the 2000s. The AutoMat initiative was established in 2003 and became a formal civic association in 2007. It has promoted walking, cycling, public transport and other forms of sustainable urban mobility in Prague.

== Infrastructure and route network ==
Prague has a network of approximately 550 km cycling routes, which includes separated cycle paths, reserved cycle lanes and lanes shared with buses. The Technical Administration of Roads of the City of Prague (TSK) maintains 549 km of marked routes, including 74 km of reserved cycle lanes and about 40 km of lanes shared with buses. The network has expanded substantially since the 2010s, but important gaps remain, particularly in parts of the inner city.

The route network is divided into three categories. Routes A1–A9 and A50 form the highest category and are intended to provide the most important citywide connections at the highest standard of cycling infrastructure. Routes A10–A49 form a second tier of major citywide routes, while routes A100–A599 comprise the remaining citywide routes. Routes A1 and A2 broadly follow the left and right banks of the Vltava.

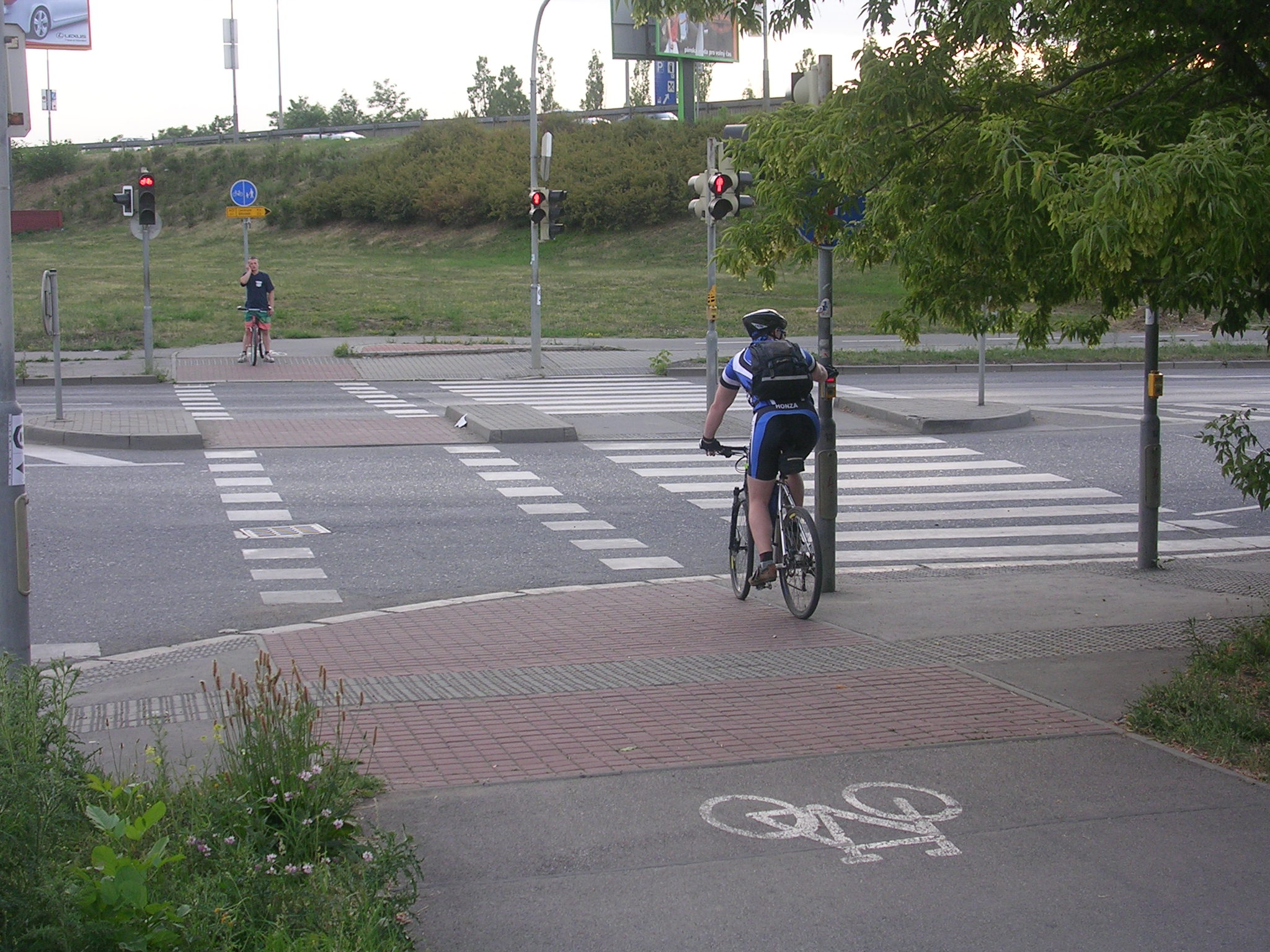
Cyclists on traffic crossing for cyclists, Prague 4, 2008

== Bike sharing ==
Bike sharing in Prague developed during the 2010s. The Czech service Rekola began operating in Prague in 2013, initially using refurbished donated bicycles. Nextbike launched its Prague service in March 2020.

In October 2021, Prague began a pilot programme integrating shared bicycles with Prague Integrated Transport (PID). Holders of an electronic Prague public-transport season ticket can link their Lítačka account to either operator and receive two rides of up to 15 minutes per day without an additional charge. Use of the scheme increased from 756,843 rides in 2023 to 981,356 in 2024.

In 2026, Prague introduced a unified regulatory framework for shared bicycles and e-bikes. Participating operators are required to use designated parking locations and comply with common operating and maintenance requirements.

== Bicycles on public transport ==
Bicycles can be carried on several parts of the Prague Integrated Transport (PID) network, including the Prague Metro, trains, ferries and selected tram services. Carriage is generally free; passengers must have a valid PID ticket.

On the metro, up to two bicycles may be carried in door areas of each carriage, except at the front of the train. Bicycles are also permitted on designated tram sections running away from the city centre. They are generally not carried on city buses, except on selected seasonal services of route 147 between Dejvická and Suchdol.

== Gallery ==
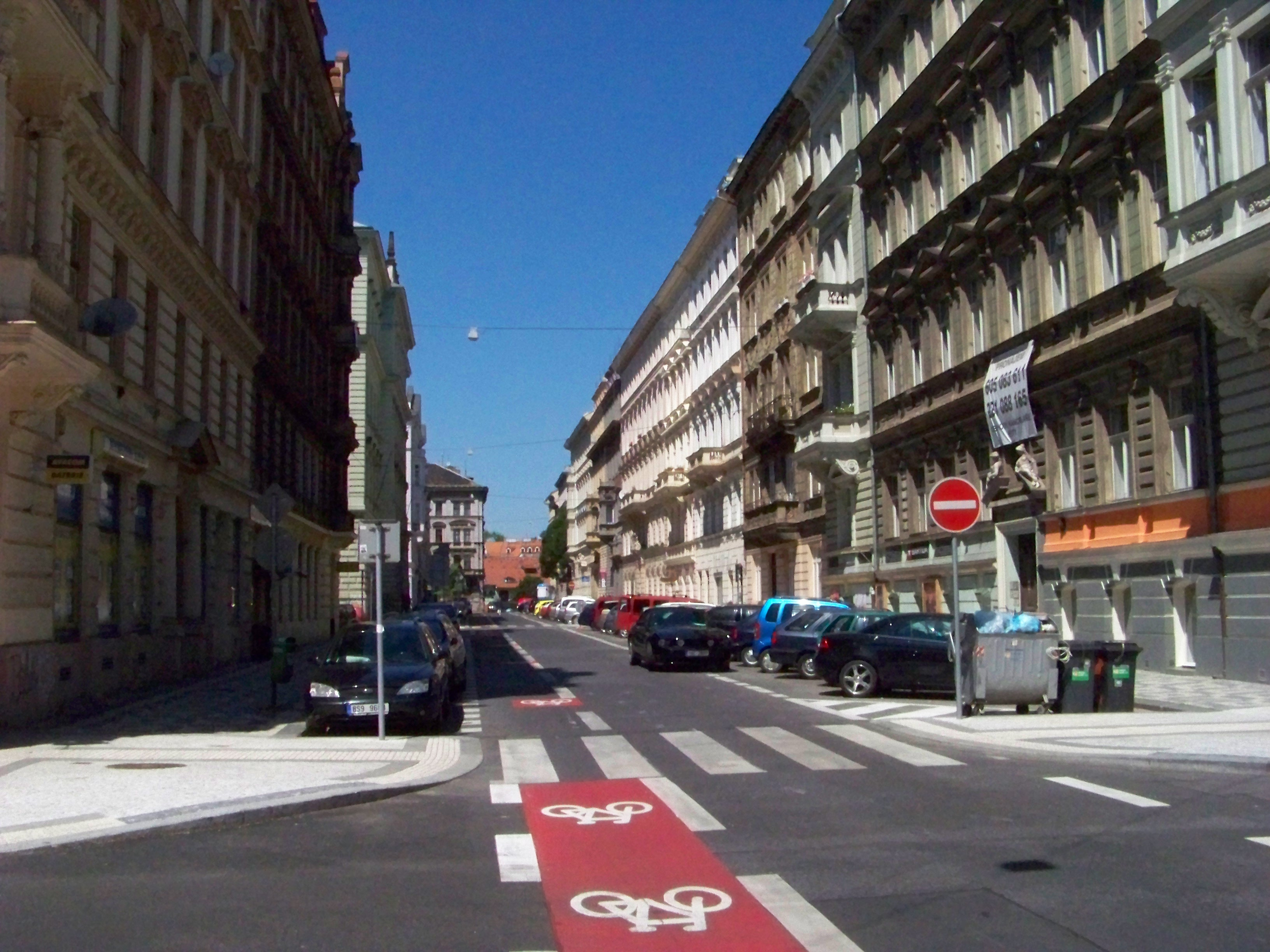
Cycle lane in the city centre, Zborovská street, between Malá Strana and Smíchov

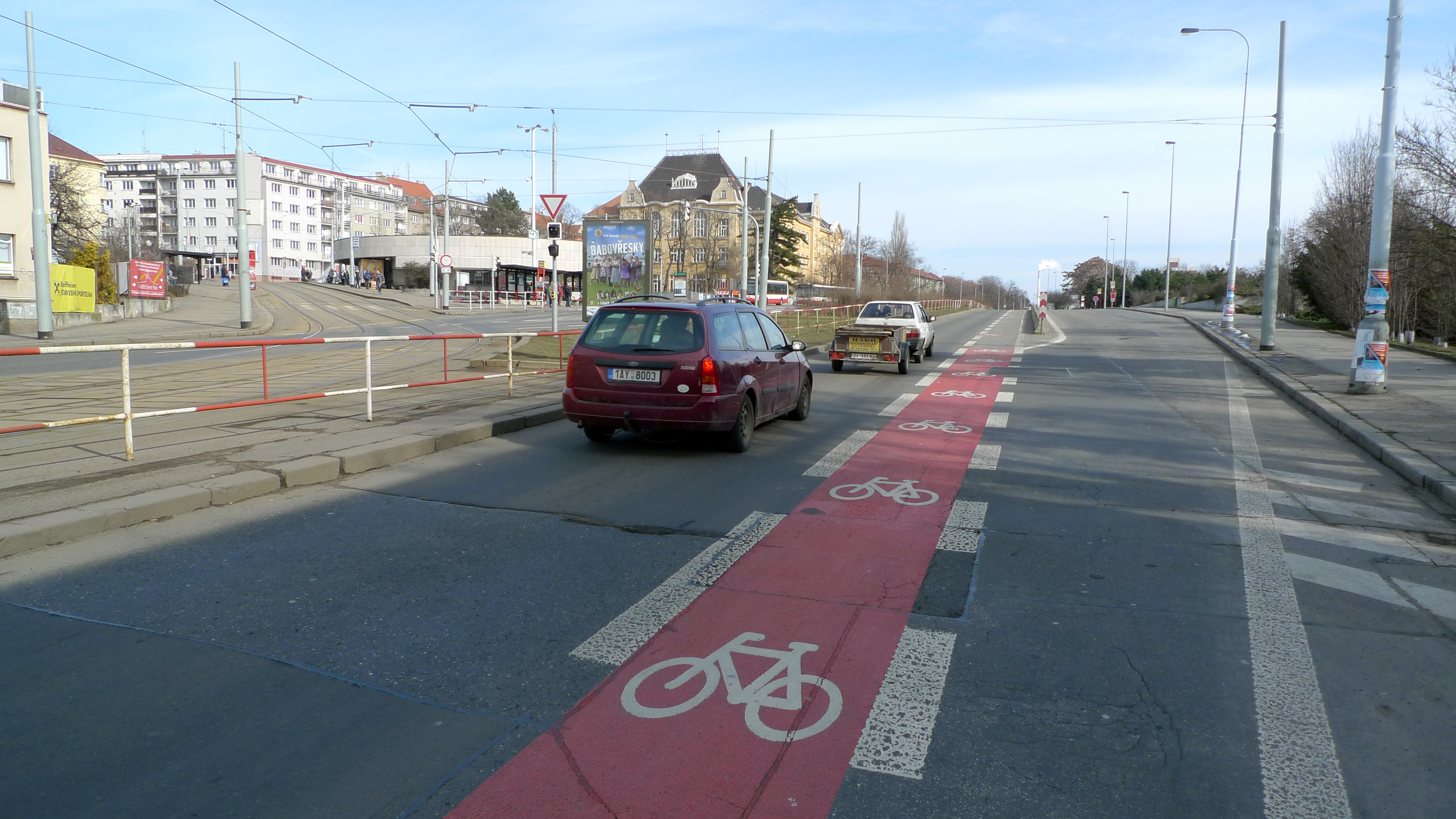
Bicycle lane in street V Olšinách

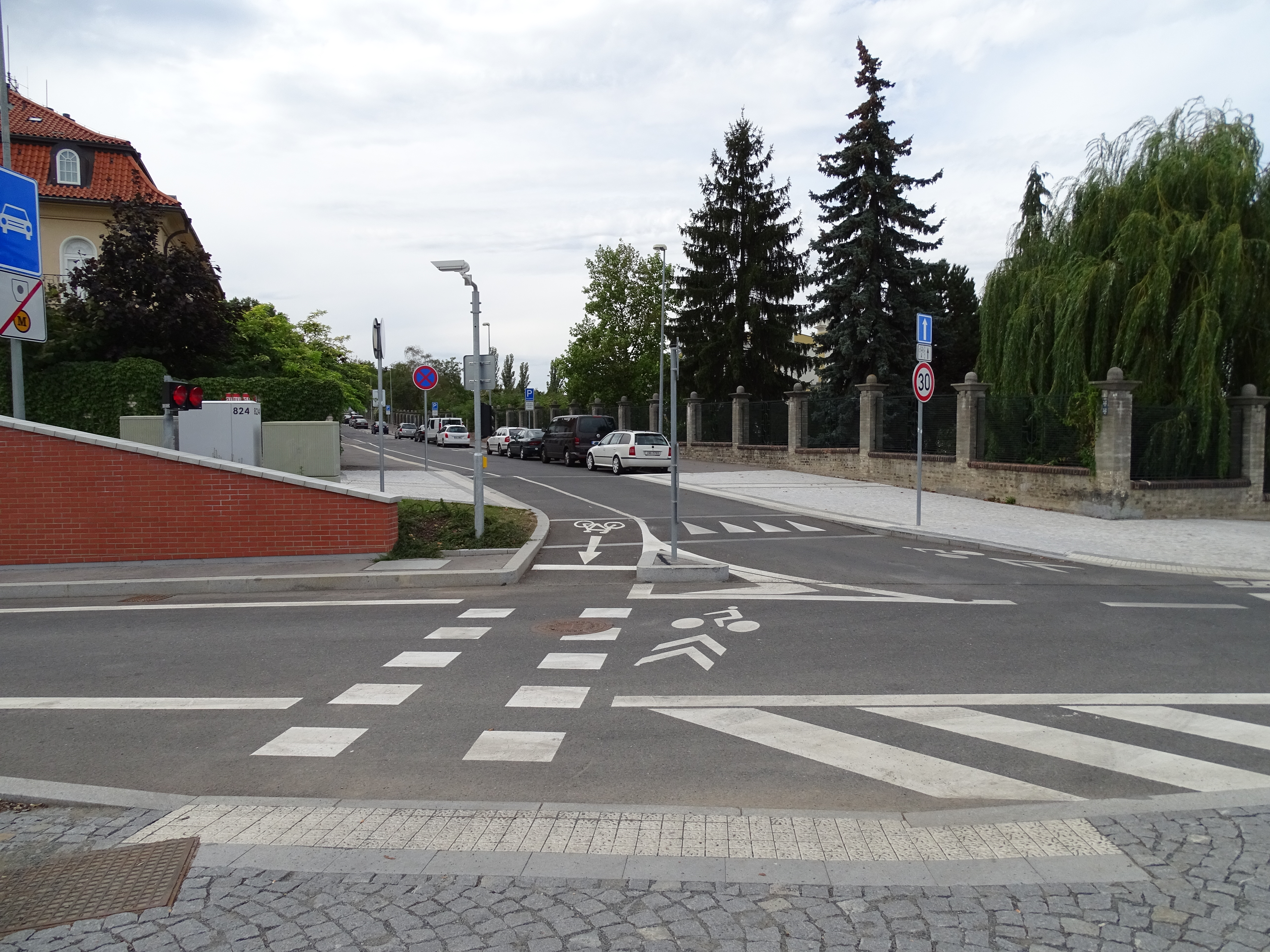
Contra-flow cycle lanes and cycle crossing next to Blanka tunnel complex

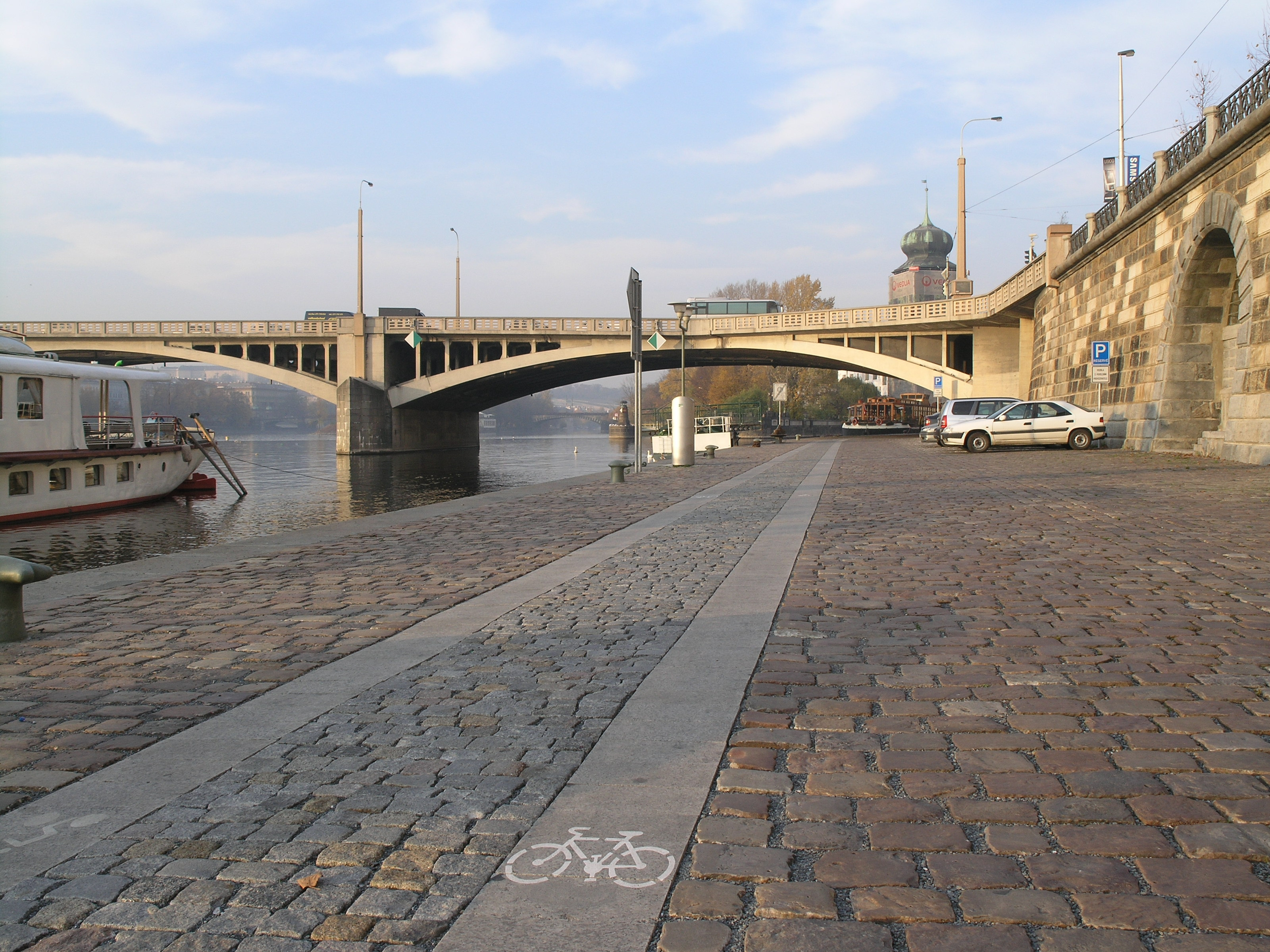
Soft stones on Rašínovo riverside are used as a bike lane. This riverside is the busiest cycling route in the city centre.

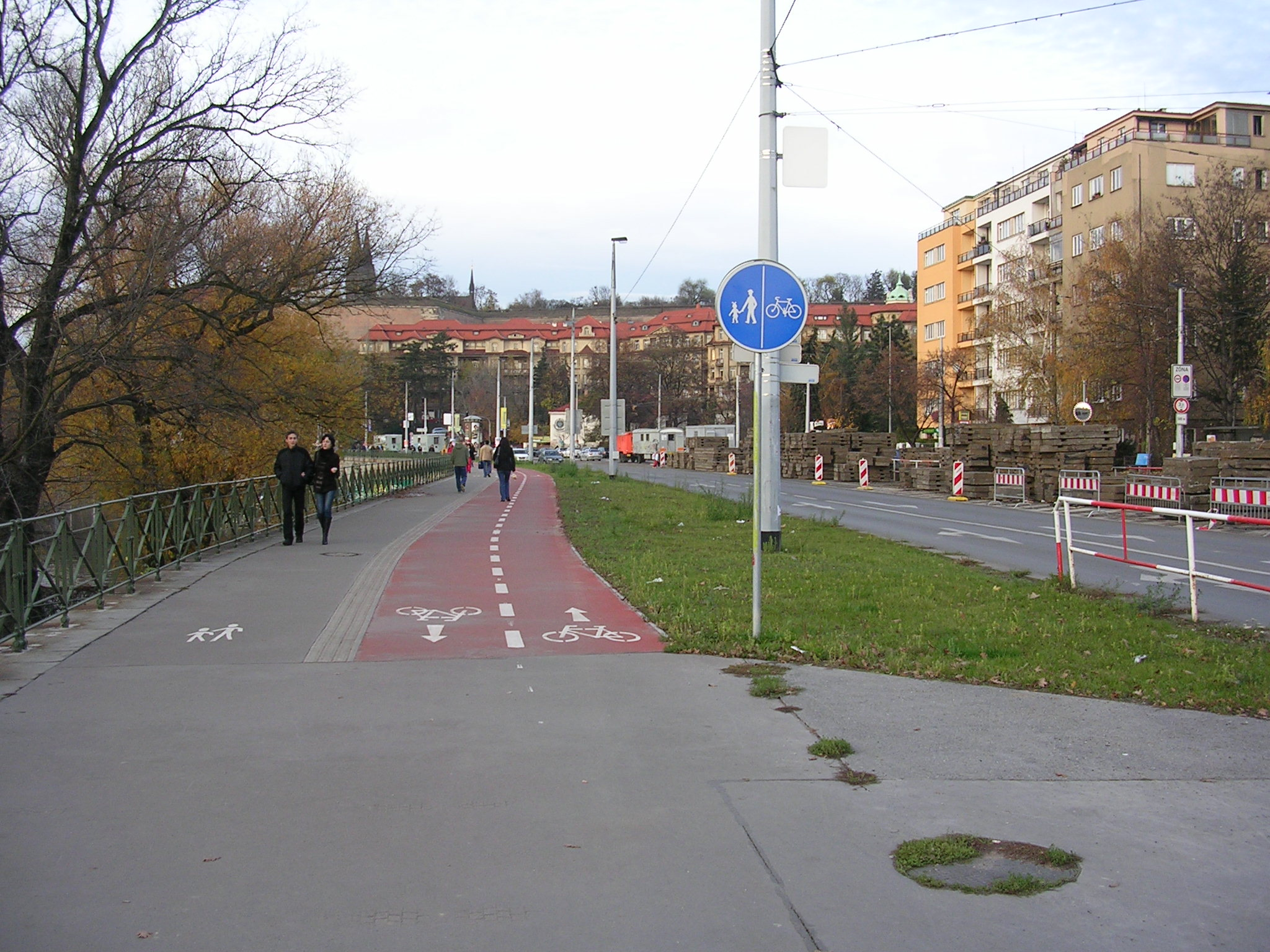
Separated pedestrian way and bikeway, Podolské riverside under Vyšehrad

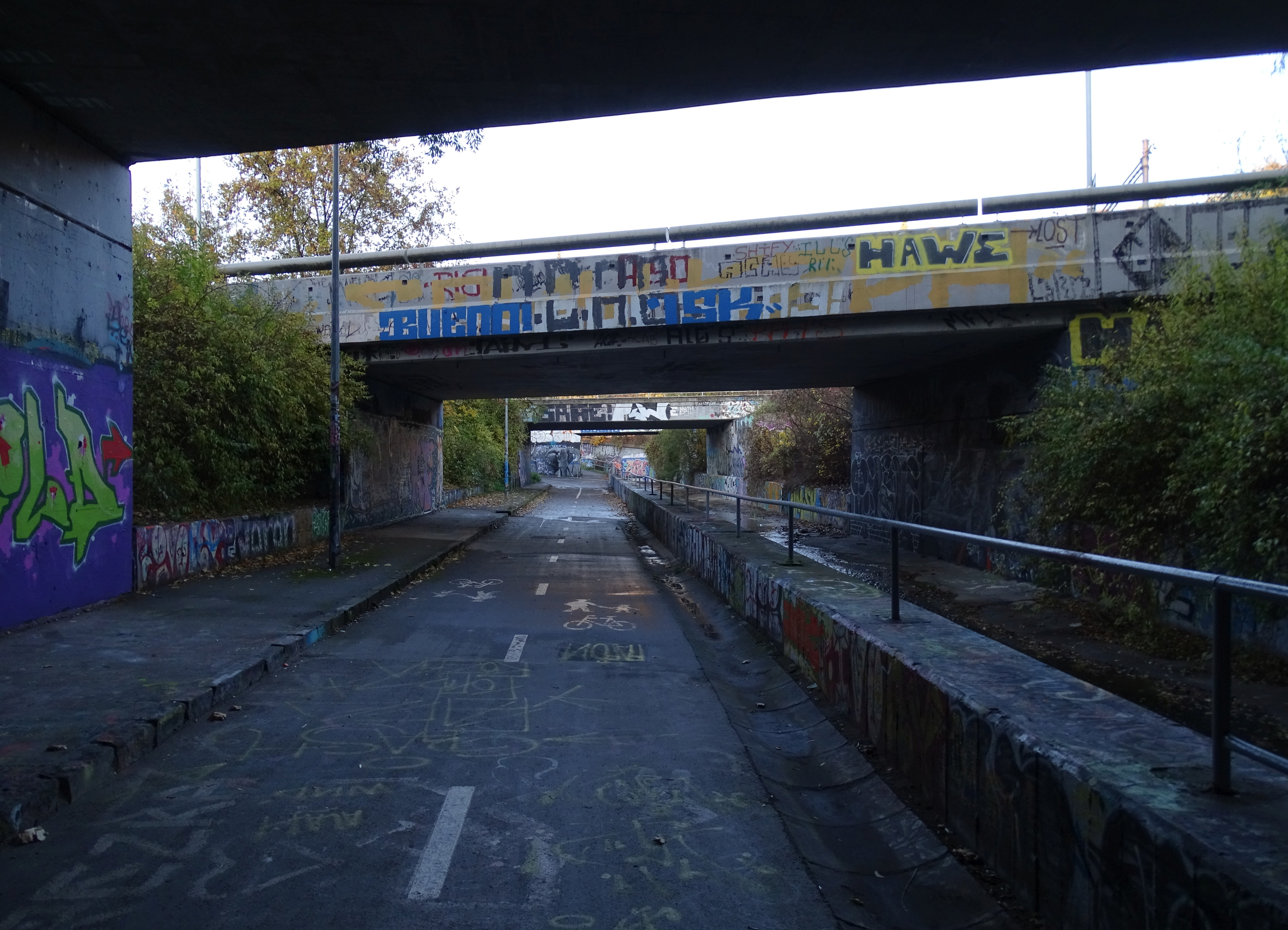
Bikeway under Barrandov Bridge, 2017
