= Legible Prague =

Prague public wayfaring system

- Country: Czech Republic
- Established: 2022
- Launched: 2023
- Funding: Public
- Status: Under implementation
- Website: https://pid.cz/citelna-praha/

Legible Prague (Czech: Čitelná Praha) is a wayfinding project of public signage, structures, boards, and maps being implemented in Prague. It replaces older navigation aids across Prague in order to create one unified system for Prague Integrated Transport, the Prague Metro, and the streets of Prague.

The Legible Prague project aims to facilitate navigation through the city for everyone, including individuals with physical, sensory, or other impairments, as well as parents with strollers, travelers with luggage, senior citizens, and children.

Some elements of the system have been criticized, like small text, or confusing pictograms. These concerns were addressed and enhancements made.

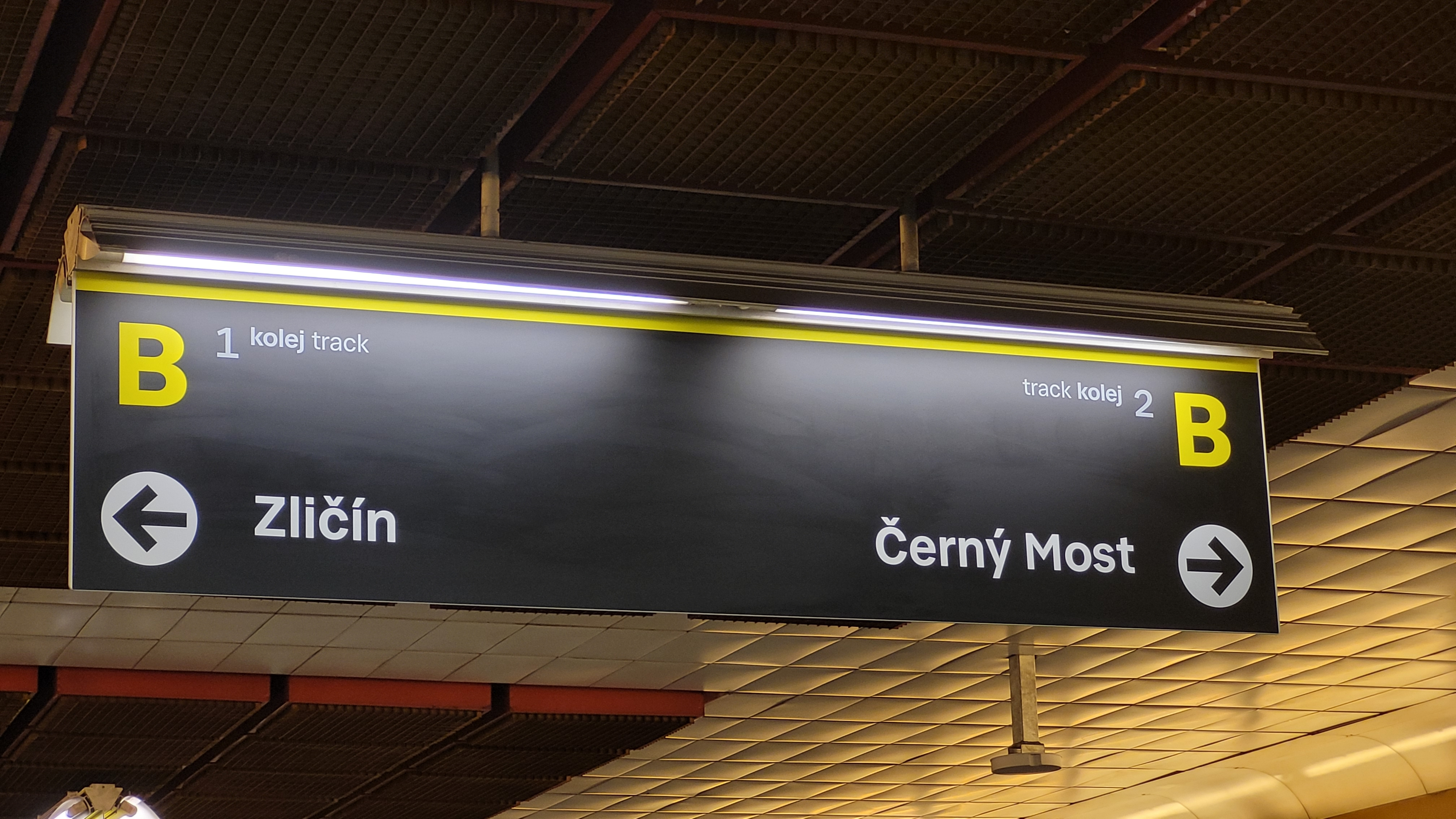
Example of an info board in the Palmovka metro station using Legible Prague

== History ==
The system originates from an international design competition announced on 6 September 2021 and concluded on 31 January 2022. It is currently in its implementation phase and is undergoing testing in the streets. The system will replace outdated, inconsistent signage from the 1970s and 1980s.

Inspired by Legible London, it seeks to make wayfinding in Prague easier to understand both for tourists and locals. The first place to adopt this new schema was the western part of the Palmovka metro station, with Háje, Karlovo náměstí and Palackého náměstí.

== Future developments ==
Some users initially disliked the black background of the signage, and the wheelchair access icons. Between late 2024 and early 2025, the maps inside metro train carriages were replaced with the Legible Prague design. The full network diagram is now positioned above one door, while the map of the relevant line appears above the opposite door. At selected doors, diagrams also provide detailed information about the city centre and connecting tram lines. These replace the "excerpt from the contractual transport conditions" signs, which were considered to have minimal benefit for passengers.

== Components ==
=== Totems ===
Totems are large rectangular boxes placed on lampposts to indicate a metro or a train station nearby. They include the Prague Metro logo, and the "S" logo if they point out a commuter rail train station. At night, they are backlit by lights in the color of the metro line, and white for trains.

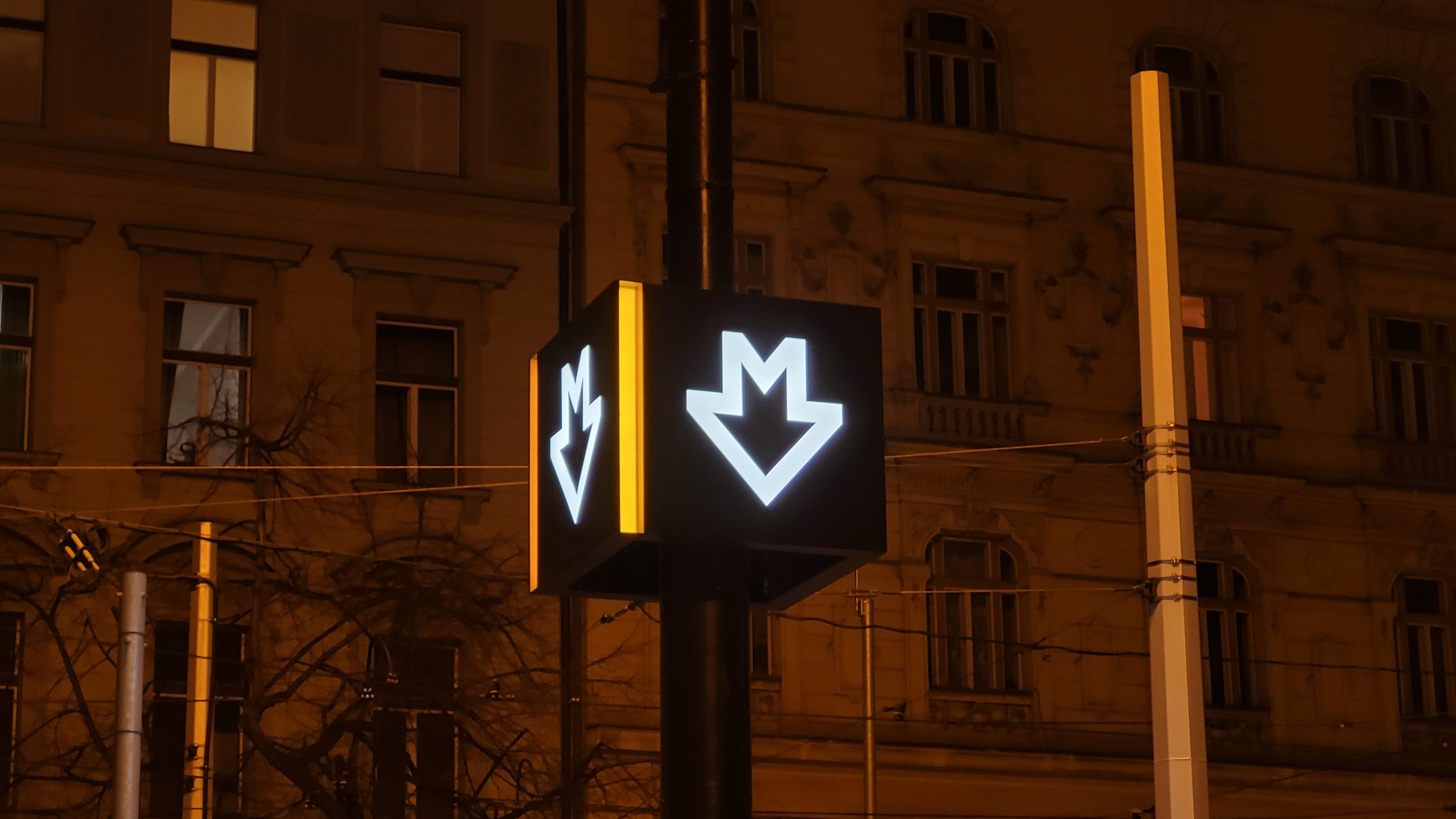
Totem example for metro

=== Obelisks ===
Obelisks are vertical information stands, usually placed on streets, that contain a map of the surrounding area rotated relative to the obelisk, information about nearby landmarks, and the walk time to reach them in minutes. The top of the obelisk is painted bright orange and has the heading "Prague Walker".

=== Digital departure panels ===
These panels are mounted near bus or tram stops and show the nearest vehicle departure times in minutes, whether they are barrier-free, and, in the summer months, if the vehicle has air conditioning. Prague's company THMP installs and services them. They can also be integrated into bus shelters in high-traffic areas.

=== Signposts ===
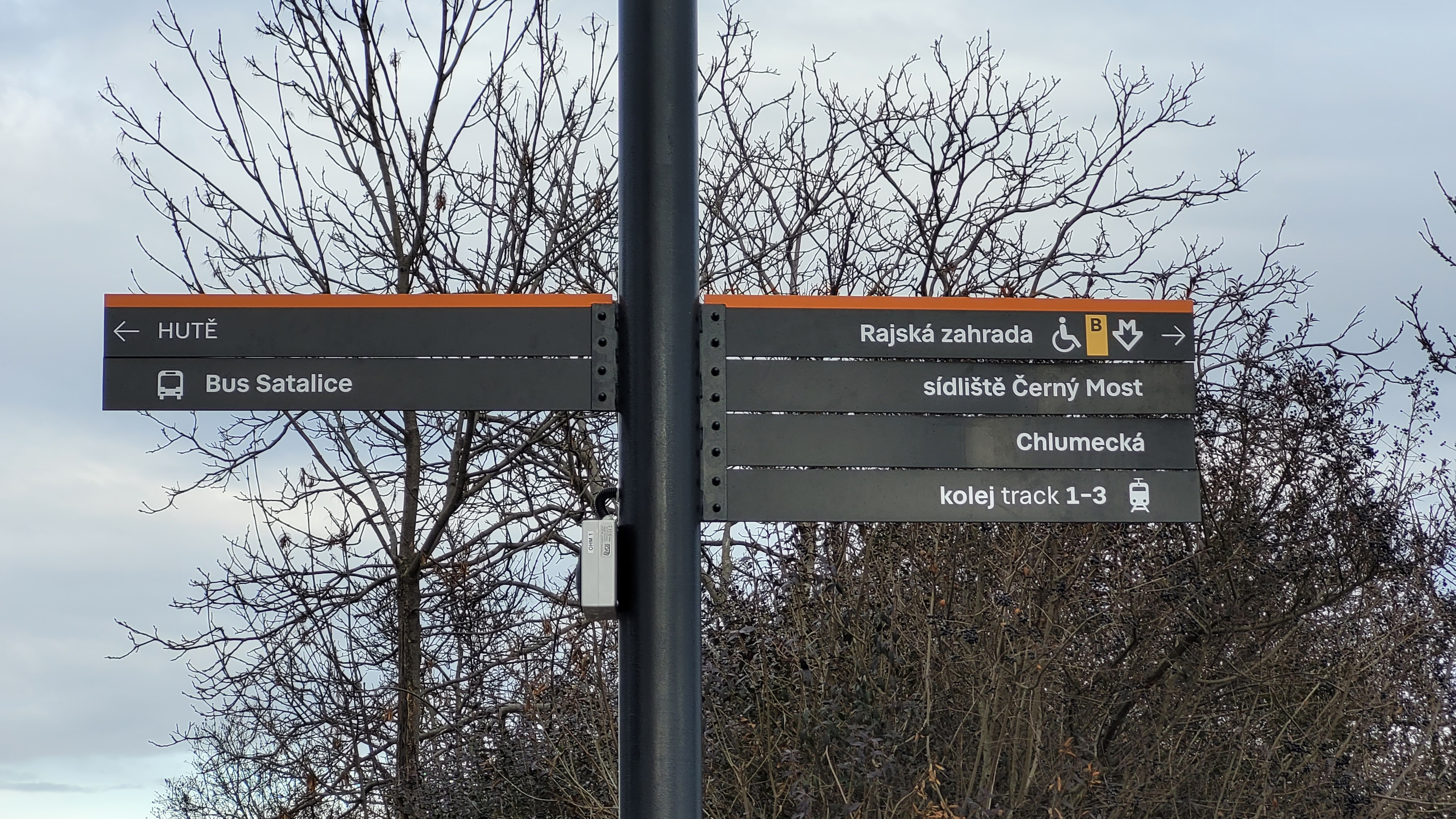
Signpost example

The new signposts are designed to replace the older, bulkier navigation used commonly in Prague, and their function is nearly identical, but they contain less clutter and focus on the destinations, include pictograms, and are in black. They also include the walking time in minutes.

=== Information boards ===
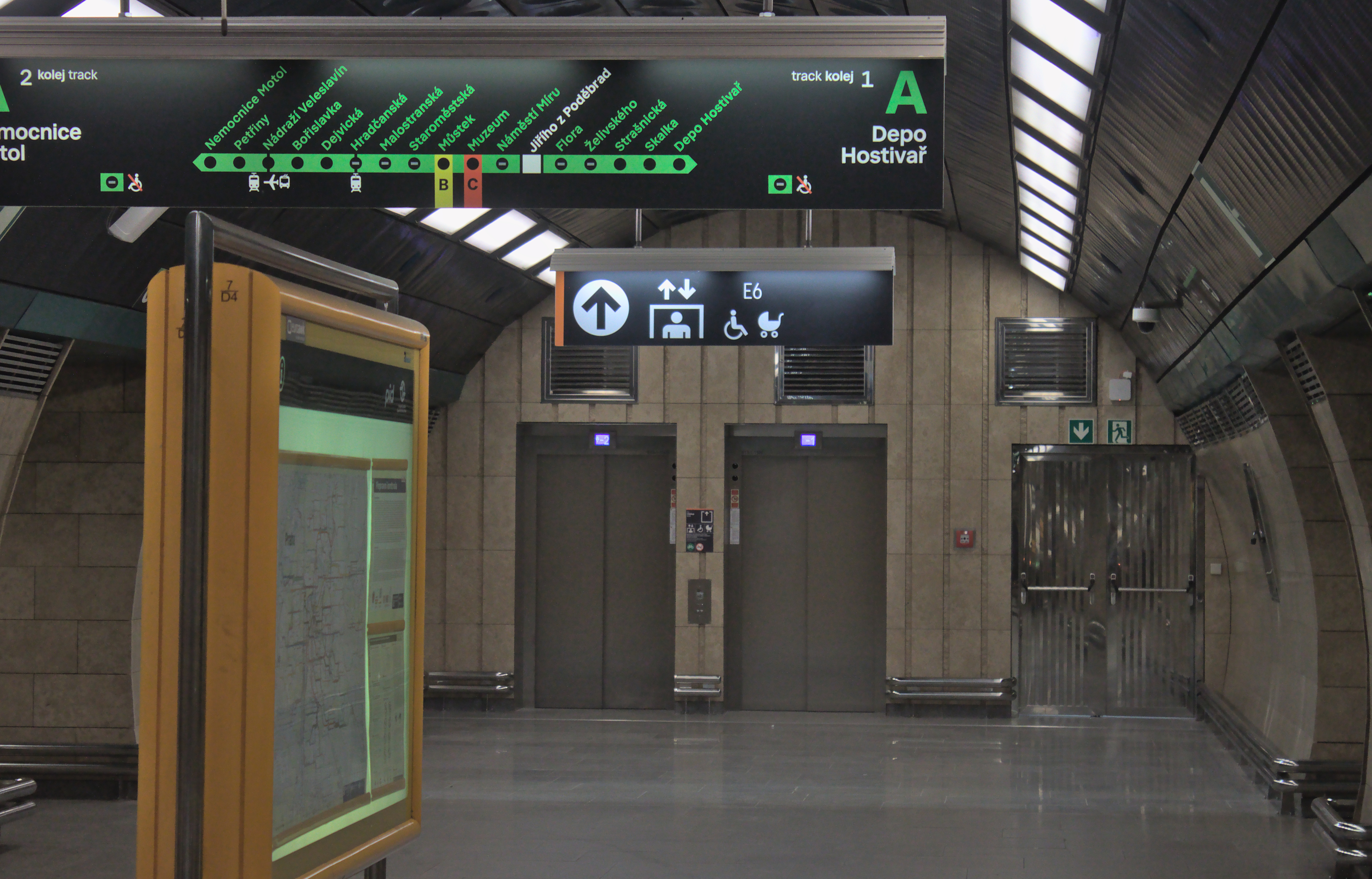
An info board in the Jiřího z Poděbrad station

These are used now in the Prague Metro, replacing the old system. The new graphics aim to be easier to read at a glance.

=== Bus shelter vitrines ===
The vitrines contain a map of the bus stop surroundings, fare information, and notification of transport irregularities if any. They are made of durable glass.

== Future outlook ==
The 2026 plans focus on a large‑scale rollout of the unified navigation system across Prague's public transport, streets, and digital platforms.

=== Metro navigation upgrades ===
- 10–15 stations will receive updated navigation graphics, including the newly reconstructed station Českomoravská.
- New illuminated signage carriers will be tested at Palmovka.
- Metro vestibules will gain new digital screens showing upcoming departures.
- Updated maps, diagrams, and disruption information will be introduced across stations.

=== Improved pedestrian navigation ===
The city of Prague will install dozens of new Legible Prague components and signage across Prague, such as areas of the Prague Castle, Letná, Wenceslas Square, the newly built Dvorecký Bridge and the Petřín funicular.

==== Other improvements ====
Buses will receive new digital screen graphics, including transfer options at the next stop.

A full redesign of stop signage (except timetables) will be implemented across the city.

The "PID Lítačka" mobile app will be updated with new graphics.

The rollout of totems will continue, covering the remaining stations that do not yet have them.

== See also ==
- Transport in Prague
- Prague Integrated Transport
- Prague Metro
