= Signpost (company) =

American marketing automation company

Signpost, Inc.
- Company type: Private
- Available in: English
- Headquarters: 127 West 26th St., New York, New York
- Area served: Local businesses
- Founders: Stuart Wall, John Buchanan, Shaneal Manek
- CEO: Lucas Wilson
- Industry: Software
- Products: Local marketing automation
- Services: Keegan Janowiak
- Employees: 300 (January 2016)
- Website: signpost.com
- Registration: Required
- Current status: Active
- Written in: Node.js

Signpost is a technology company that develops CRM and marketing automation software for local businesses to build relationships with new and existing customers.

In both 2014 and 2015 Signpost was named by Forbes as one of America's Most Promising Companies The company is headquartered in New York City and has offices in Austin and Denver.

In the fall of 2014 and 2015, Signpost was ranked as a "Top Workplace" by The Austin American Statesman and Crain's New York

== Product ==
Signpost manages online interactions between businesses and their customers. Their software automates three steps in building customer relationships: online presence management, capturing customer information, and remarketing.

Signpost's online presence management aims to help local businesses to update, verify, and enhance their business information on social and mobile listings such as Google+, Facebook, and Yelp. Their software builds customer profiles by capturing every email, phone call, and credit card transaction. By using the customer data for each contact, the software automatically follows up with each customer in a personalized way encouraging new customers, repeat business, getting five star reviews, and referrals.

== History ==
The company was founded in 2010 by Stuart Wall and John Buchanan out of Harvard Business School. It has raised $30M in venture funding from Georgian Partners, Google Ventures, Spark Capital, OpenView Venture Partners, Scout Ventures and a group of angel investors including Jason Calacanis, Thomas Lehrman, and Jack Herrick.
