= Modletice =

- Municipality
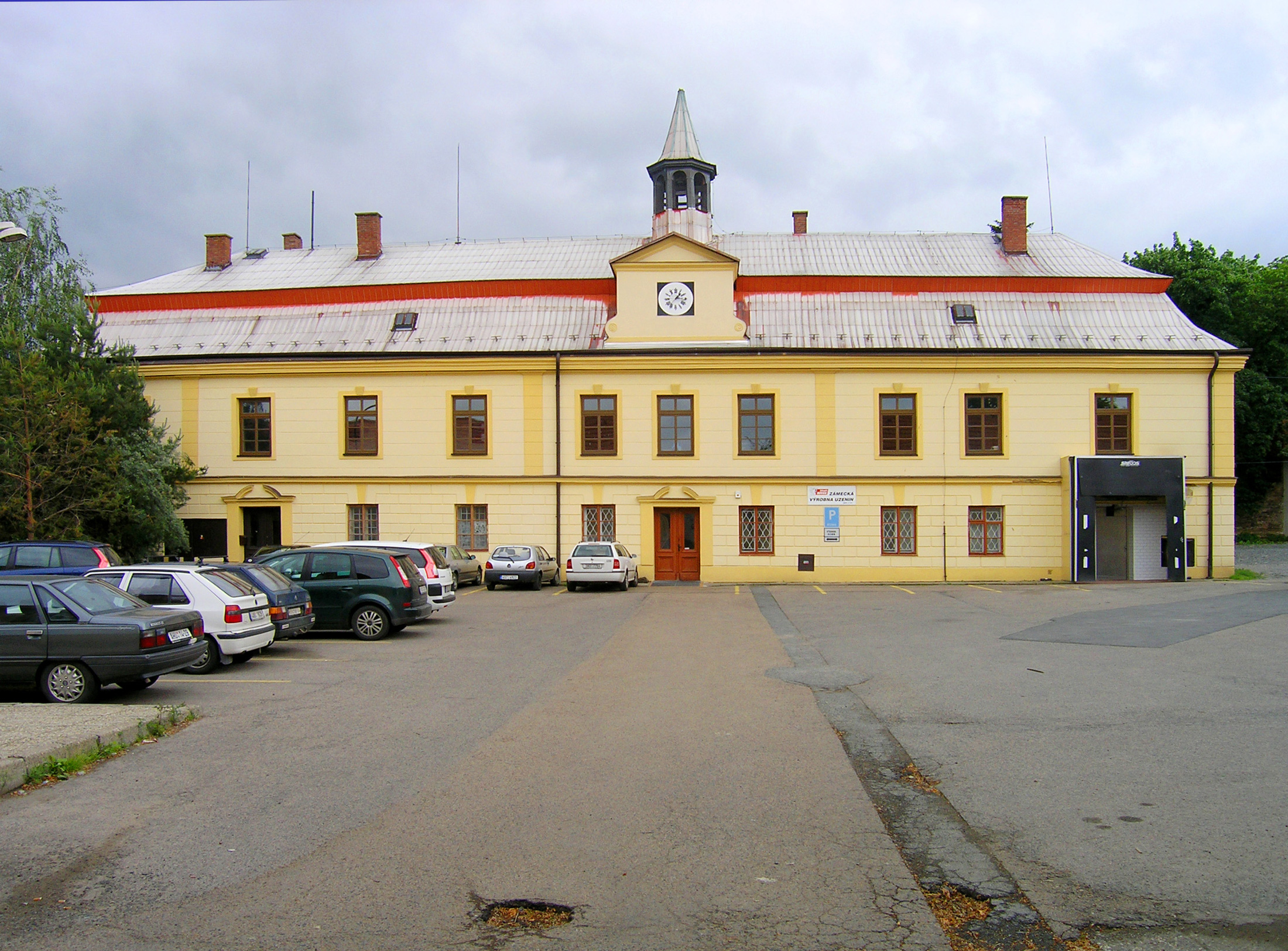
- Modletice Castle

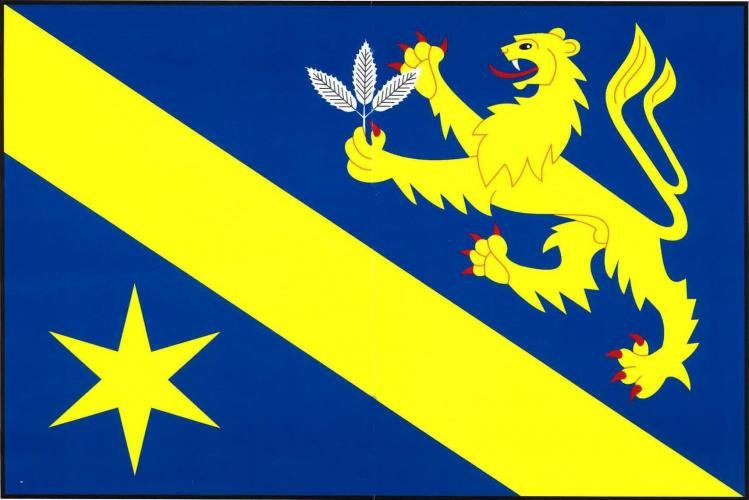
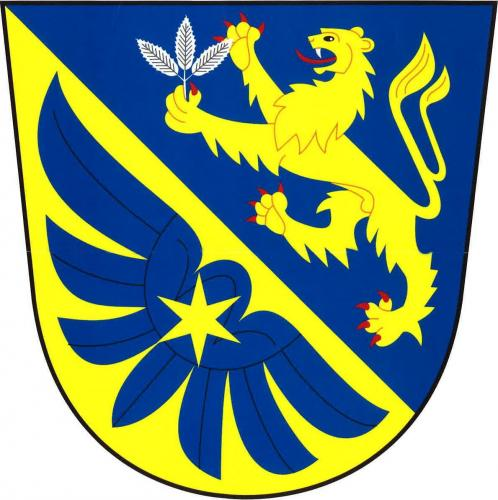
- Flag Coat of arms

- Location in the Czech Republic
- Coordinates: 49°58′13″N 14°35′28″E
- Country: Czech Republic
- Region: Central Bohemian
- District: Prague-East
- First mentioned: 1336

Area
  - Total: 3.44 km^{2} (1.33 sq mi)
- Elevation: 357 m (1,171 ft)

Population (2026-01-01)
  - Total: 609
  - Density: 177/km^{2} (459/sq mi)
- Time zone: UTC+1 (CET)
  - Summer (DST): UTC+2 (CEST)
- Postal code: 251 01
- Website: www.modletice.cz

Modletice is a municipality and village in Prague-East District in the Central Bohemian Region of the Czech Republic. It has about 600 inhabitants. It is known for its large industrial zone.

== Etymology ==
The name is derived from the personal name Modlata, meaning "the village of Modlata's people".

== Geography ==
Modletice is located about 8 kilometres (5 mi) southeast of Prague. It lies mostly in a flat landscape in the Prague Plateau. The southeastern part of the municipal territory extends into the Benešov Uplands and includes the highest point of Modletice at 407 m (1,335 ft) above sea level. The stream Chomutovický potok flows through the municipality and supplies there two small fishponds.

== History ==
The first written mention of Modletice is from 1336. It was owned by various lower noblemen and burghers.

== Demographics ==
Historical population

Year	Pop.	±%
1869	274	—
1880	255	−6.9%
1890	247	−3.1%
1900	264	+6.9%
1910	264	+0.0%

Year	Pop.	±%
1921	254	−3.8%
1930	226	−11.0%
1950	161	−28.8%
1961	153	−5.0%
1970	153	+0.0%

Year	Pop.	±%
1980	236	+54.2%
1991	360	+52.5%
2001	361	+0.3%
2011	583	+61.5%
2021	545	−6.5%

Source: Censuses

== Economy ==
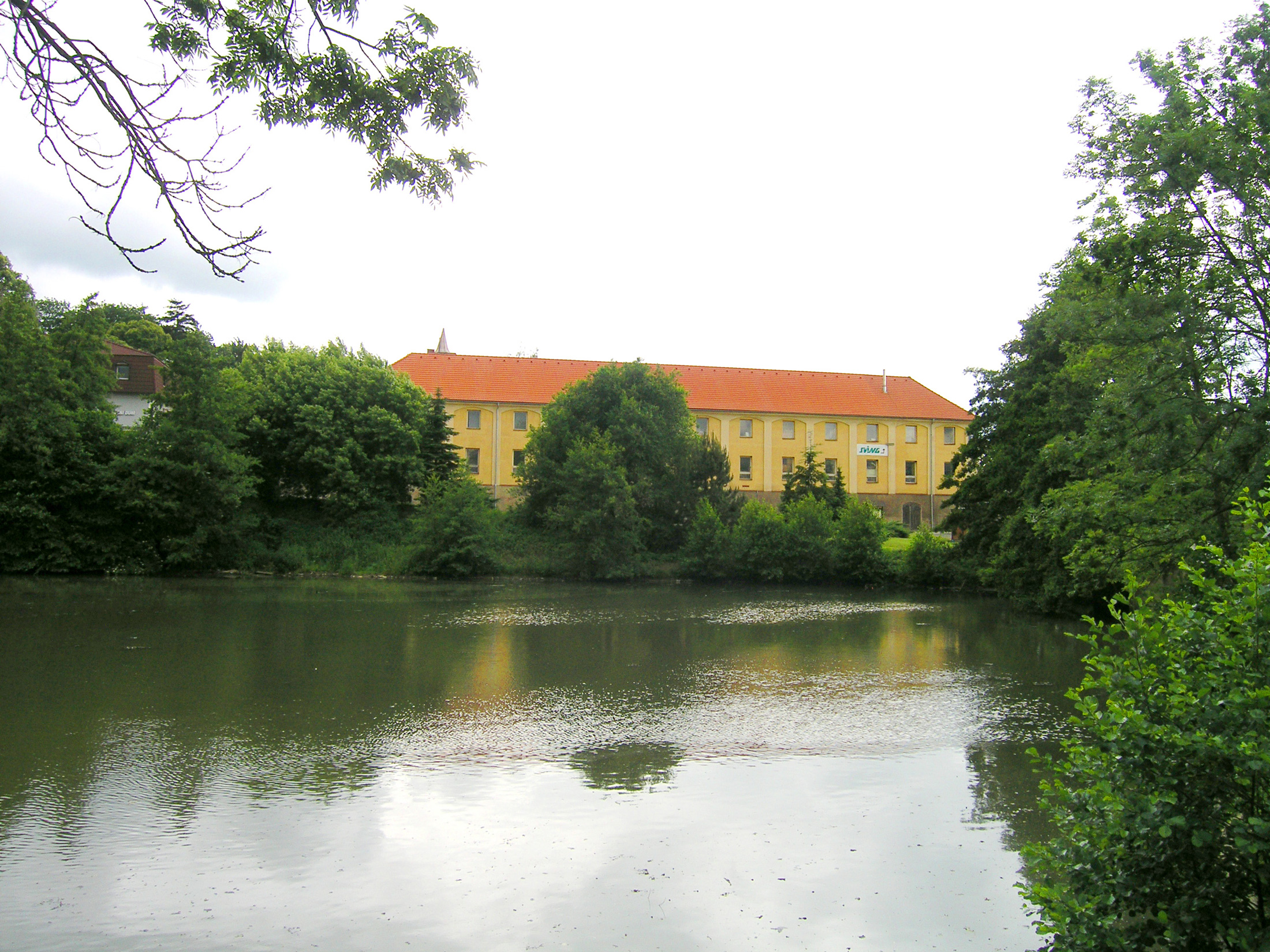
View of Modletice Castle across the Zámecký pond

Modletice is known for its large industrial zone, which benefits from the proximity of Prague and the motorways. It mainly consists of logistics centres. The Czech branch of Billa, one of the largest employers in the country, has its headquarters in Modletice.

== Transport ==
Modletice is located at the junction of the D0 and D1 motorways.

== Sights ==
There are no significant monuments. The main landmark of Modletice is the Modletice Castle. It is a Baroque castle from the 18th century, but lost its historical value due to insensitive reconstructions.
