= Sign Post, Virginia =

Unincorporated community in Virginia, United States

Coordinates: 37°59′47″N 75°27′39″W

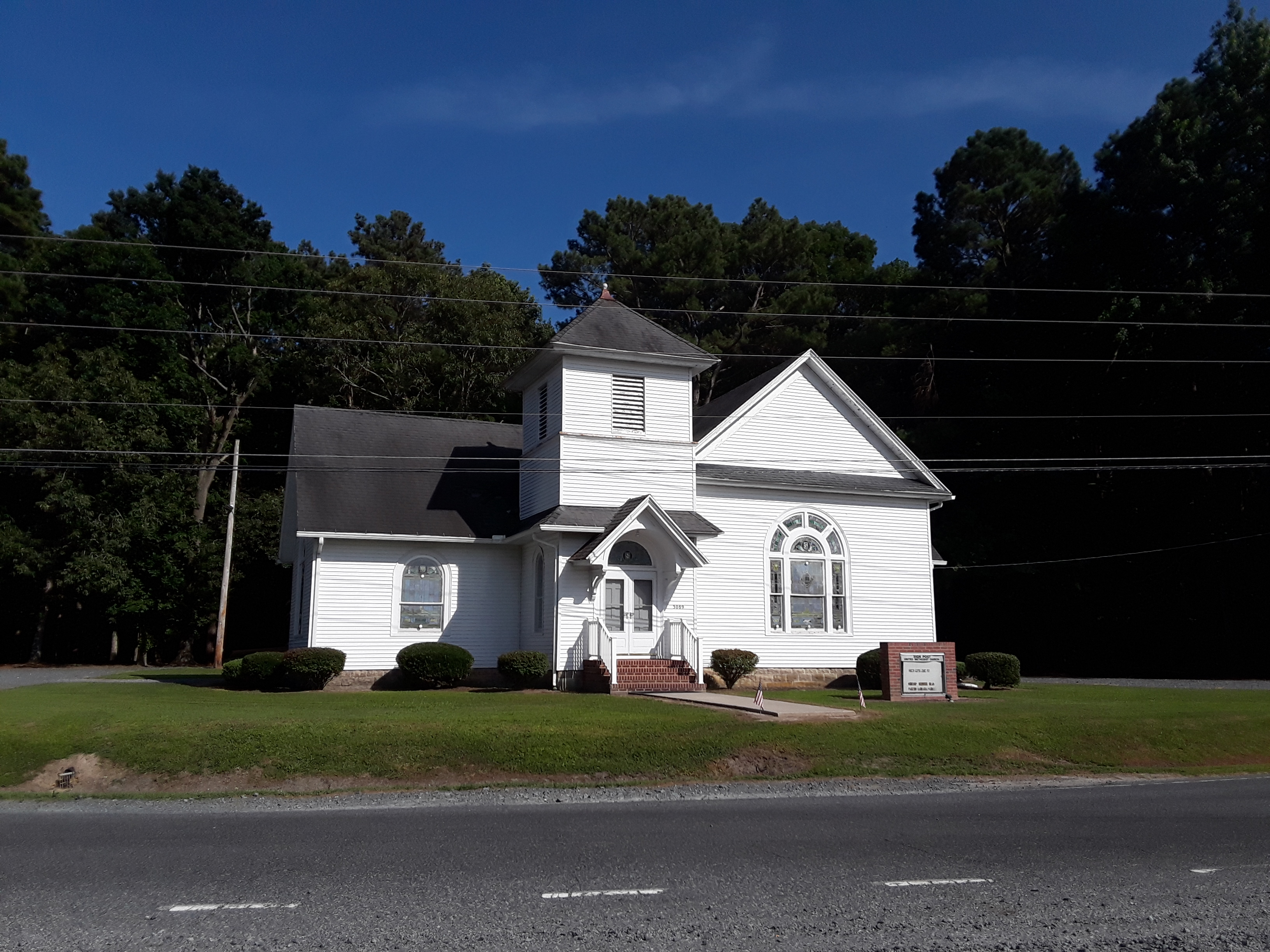
Sign Post United Methodist Church in July 2018

Sign Post is an unincorporated community in Accomack County, Virginia, United States.
