= Rekola =

Bicycle sharing scheme in the Czech Republic and Slovakia

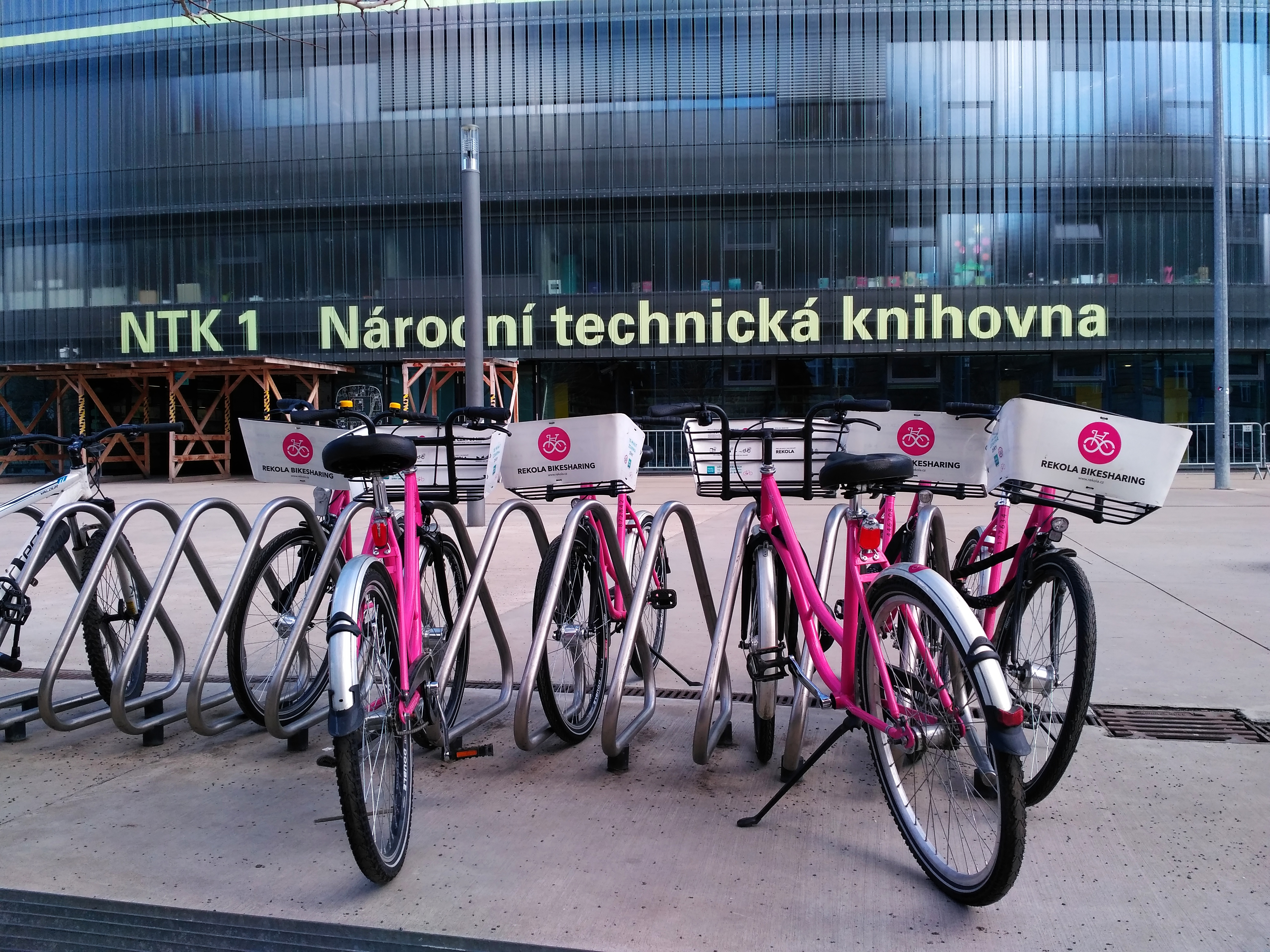
- Rekola in front of Czech National Library of Technology, Prague

Overview
- Area served: 4 (2023)
- Locale: Prague, Czech Republic, Bratislava, Slovakia and other 6 cities
- Transit type: Bicycle-sharing system
- Annual ridership: 2,029,522 (2024)
- Chief executive: Vít Ježek
- Website: rekola.cz

Operation
- Began operation: 2013; 13 years ago
- Number of vehicles: 2,000+ (2019)

Rekola is a Czech bicycle-sharing system founded in Prague in 2013 by Vít Ježek. It began as a volunteer project in which donated and second-hand bicycles were refurbished, painted pink and made available for sharing, before developing into a professional bicycle-sharing operator.

Rekola operates in cities in the Czech Republic, Slovakia, Estonia and Poland, including Prague, Bratislava and Tallinn. Its distinctive pink bicycles are located and unlocked using the Rekola mobile application and are returned to designated parking areas. The service includes conventional bicycles and e-bikes. Rekola recorded more than two million rides in 2024, nearly 50 percent more than in the previous year.

== History ==
Rekola was founded in Prague in 2013 by Vít Ježek as a volunteer bicycle-sharing project. Its first bicycles were donated or bought second-hand, repaired by volunteers and painted pink. In the same year the service expanded to Brno. Then in 2014, Rekola expanded to Olomouc, and in 2015 to České Budějovice.

In 2016, investment fund Spread Capital, founded by Czech entrepreneur Ondřej Fryc, acquired a minority stake in Rekola to support its further development and expansion.

Rekola first expanded abroad in 2018, launching a bicycle-sharing service in Vaasa, Finland. The Finnish operation ended in 2020, while a new service launched in Bratislava in September of that year.

During the COVID-19 pandemic in the Czech Republic in March 2020, Rekola offered free 30-minute rides for two weeks across its Czech operations. Sponsored by Rohlik.cz and Prusa Research, the programme was intended to provide an alternative to crowded public transport.

In October 2021, Prague began a pilot programme integrating Rekola and competitor Nextbike with the Lítačka public-transport system. Holders of prepaid Prague transport passes could use shared bicycles for short journeys without an additional fee. More than 72,000 rides were made during the first three months, and the scheme was later continued as part of Prague Integrated Transport.

Rekola expanded to Tallinn, Estonia, in 2024, launching there with 200 bicycles. In the same year, the company recorded more than two million rides, nearly 50 percent more than in 2023.

== Locations ==
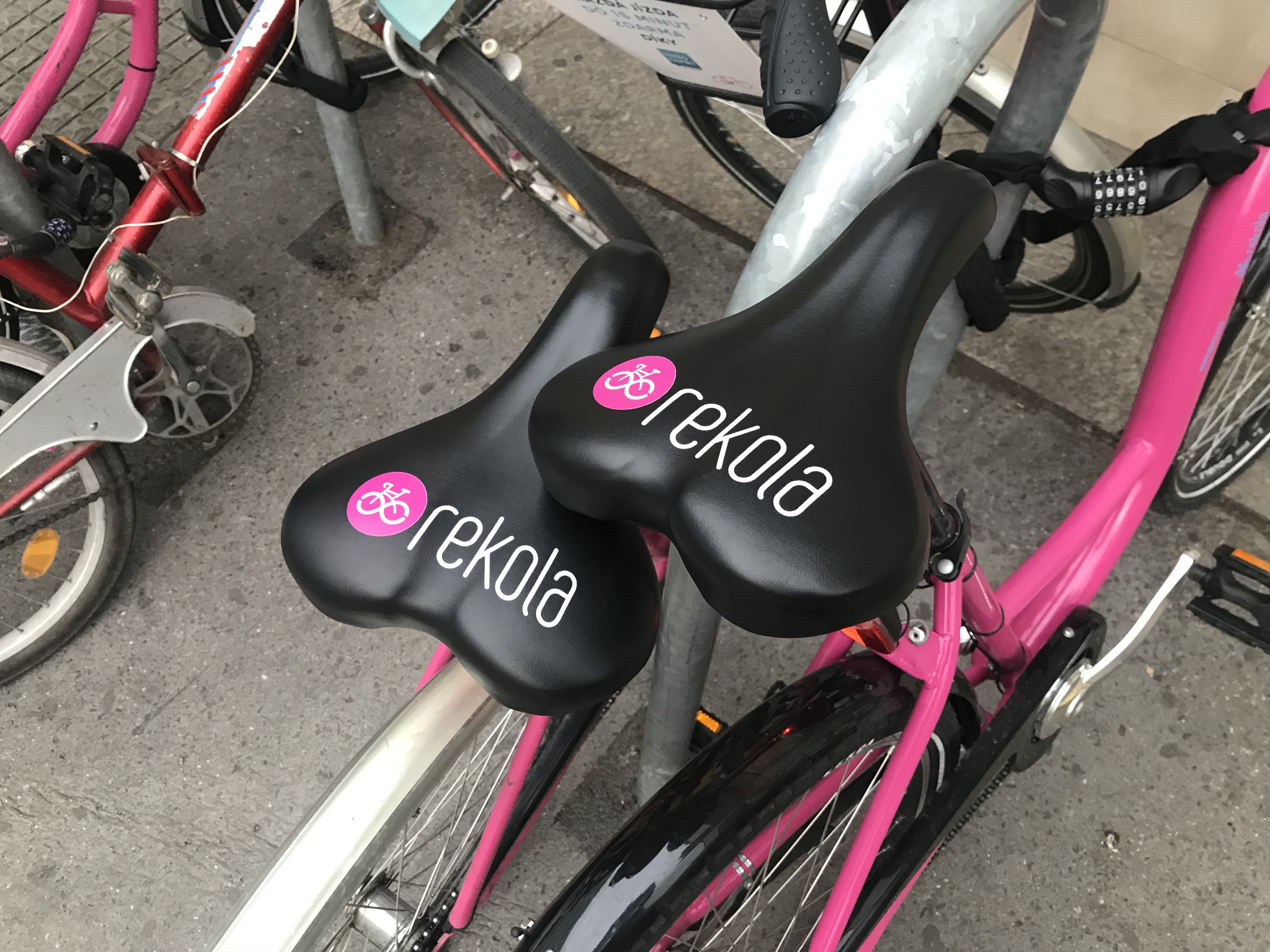
Saddles of Rekola bikes, 2018

Rekola operates bicycle-sharing systems in several municipalities in the Czech Republic, as well as in Slovakia, Estonia and Poland.

| Location | Country | Rekola since | Reported fleet | Notes |
|---|---|---|---|---|
| Prague | Czech Republic | 2013 | 1,500+ (2026) | Rekola also operates shared e-bikes in Prague. |
| Brno | Czech Republic | 2014 | – | Rekola and Nextbike participate in the city's subsidized bikesharing programme. |
| Prostějov | Czech Republic | 2023 | 180 (2025–2026) | The fleet consists of 165 conventional bicycles and 15 e-bikes. |
| Nový Jičín | Czech Republic | 2025 | 90 (2026) | Operated jointly with the neighbouring system in Kopřivnice; Rekola replaced Nextbike in February 2025. |
| Kopřivnice | Czech Republic | 2025 | about 90 (2026) | The system is integrated with that of Nový Jičín, with longer free rides available between the two cities. |
| Havířov | Czech Republic | 2025 | 200 (2025–2026) | Rekola replaced Nextbike from 1 March 2025 under a contract covering 2025 and 2026. |
| Jihlava | Czech Republic | 2025 | 140 (2026) | Rekola replaced Nextbike on 1 May 2025. |
| Veverská Bítýška and Chudčice | Czech Republic | 2026 | 21 (2026) | A joint pilot system launched on 16 February 2026. |
| Děčín | Czech Republic | 2026 | 130 (2026) | The system launched on 1 May with 110 conventional bicycles and 20 e-bikes. |
| Rudná | Czech Republic | 2026 | – | The city signed a bikesharing agreement with Rekola in July 2026. |
| Bratislava | Slovakia | 2020 | – | Rekola operates in several districts of the Slovak capital. |
| Tallinn | Estonia | 2024 | 200 (2024) | Rekola entered Tallinn with 200 conventional bicycles. |
| Polkowice | Poland | 2026 | 50 (2026) | Rekola operates the Polkowice municipal bikesharing system, which launched in July 2026 with 23 stations. |

=== Former operations ===
| Location | Country | Rekola operation | Notes |
|---|---|---|---|
| Olomouc | Czech Republic | 2014–2022 | Rekola withdrew before the 2023 season. |
| Pardubice | Czech Republic | 2014–2016 | The service ended because of low usage. |
| České Budějovice | Czech Republic | 2015–2026 | Rekola was replaced on 1 July 2026 by the municipal bicycle-sharing system CBkolo. |
| Hradec Králové | Czech Republic | 2015–2016 | The service ended because of low usage. |
| Teplice | Czech Republic | 2017–2019 | The city declined to continue funding the system. |
| Kladno | Czech Republic | 2017; 2019 | Rekola first operated a three-month pilot in 2017 and operated again in 2019; Nextbike subsequently won the city's bikesharing tender. |
| Liberec | Czech Republic | 2018–2019 | |
| Ostrava | Czech Republic | 2018–2019 | The city-supported bikesharing contract was awarded to Nextbike from 2019; Rekola continued independently in the wider city centre during that year. |
| Frýdek-Místek | Czech Republic | 2018–2020 | Nextbike replaced Rekola from the 2021 season. |
| Mladá Boleslav | Czech Republic | 2019–2020 | |
| Písek | Czech Republic | 2019 | Trial operation from June to November 2019. |
| Krnov | Czech Republic | 2024–2025 | Rekola replaced Nextbike for two years before Nextbike returned in 2026. |
| Žďár nad Sázavou | Czech Republic | 2024–2025 | Nextbike replaced Rekola for the 2026 season. |
| Most | Czech Republic | April–June 2026 | The city terminated its contract with Rekola after about three months and Nextbike returned on 1 July 2026. |
| Vaasa | Finland | 2018–2020 | Rekola's first operation outside the Czech Republic. |
