= Barrandov Bridge =

Barrandov Bridge Barrandovský most
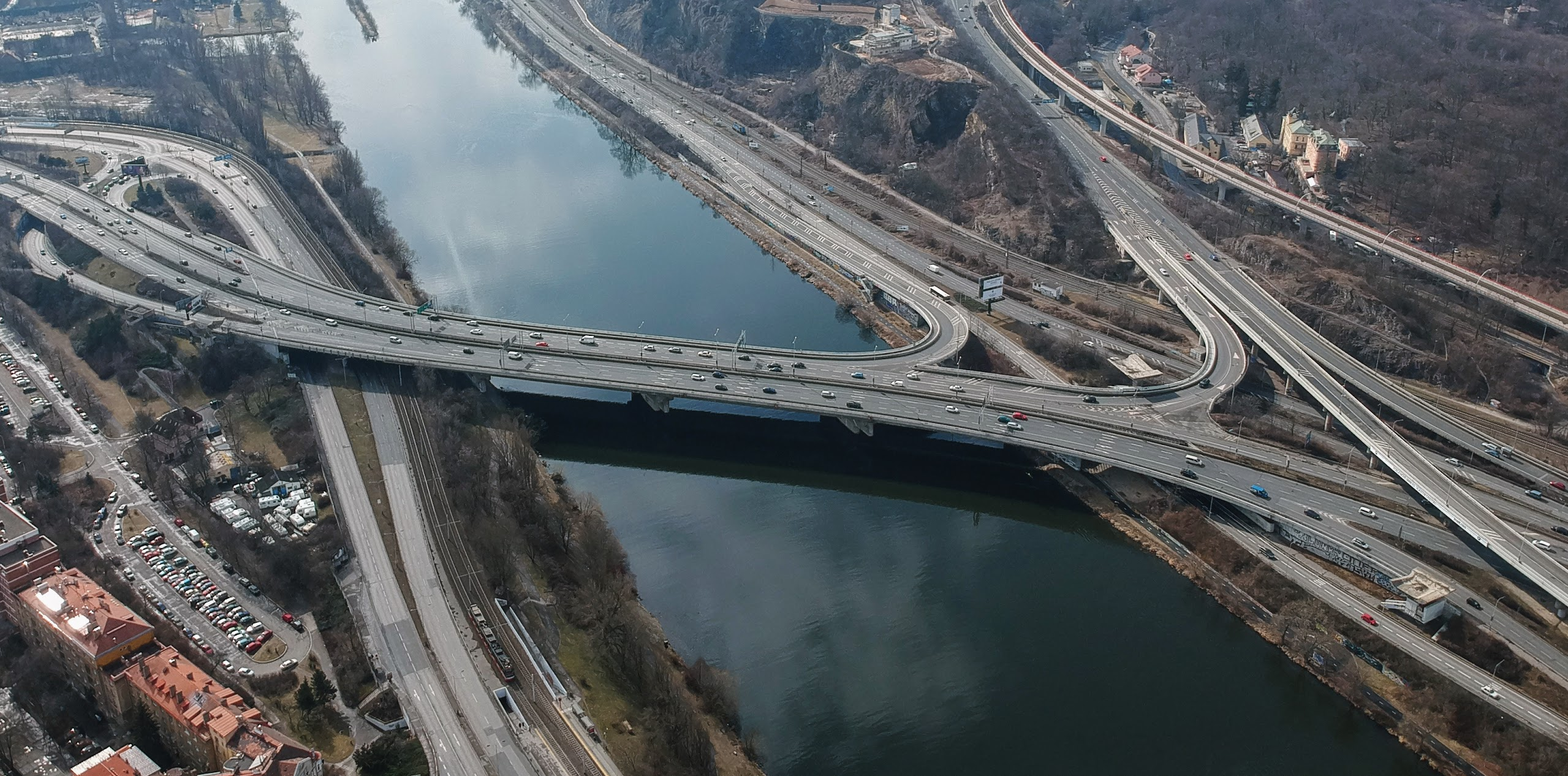
- Aerial view of Barrandov Bridge, photographed from the north
- Coordinates: 50°02′19″N 14°24′26″E
- Carries: Motor vehicles, pedestrians and bicycles
- Crosses: Vltava river
- Locale: Prague, Czech Republic

Characteristics
- Material: Concrete
- Total length: 352 m
- Width: 40 to 55 m
- Height: max 15 m
- Piers in water: 2
- No. of lanes: 8

History
- Architect: Karel Filsak
- Construction start: 1978
- Construction end: 1988

Statistics
- Daily traffic: 136 000 cars

Location
- Interactive map of Barrandov Bridge

Barrandov Bridge (Czech: Barrandovský most) is a road bridge over the Vltava river in Prague, the Czech Republic. It is the most frequented road in the whole country: over 136,000 cars ride over it daily. It connects Braník (Prague 4) and Hlubočepy (Prague 5) (Barrandov) districts. The south part was built in 1983 and the north part in 1988. The brutalist bridge was designed by Karel Filsak, with sculptures by Josef Klimeš.

== Sculptures ==
The bridge is decorated with concrete sculptures by Josef Klimeš, created in 1989–1990. Among them is Hroší lázeň ("Hippo Bath"), pictured in the gallery below.

Another of Klimeš's works near the bridge, a six-metre-high, 14-metre-long concrete sculpture titled Rovnováha ("Balance"), also known as Červ dobyvatel ("Worm the Conqueror"), collapsed on the morning of 17 July 2026, scattering debris across a traffic lane and an adjacent cycle path. No injuries were reported. The sculpture had been fenced off for some time due to its deteriorating condition, and Prague city authorities had already been planning its controlled demolition; a replica designed by architect Petr Tej is expected to be built in its place.

== Gallery ==
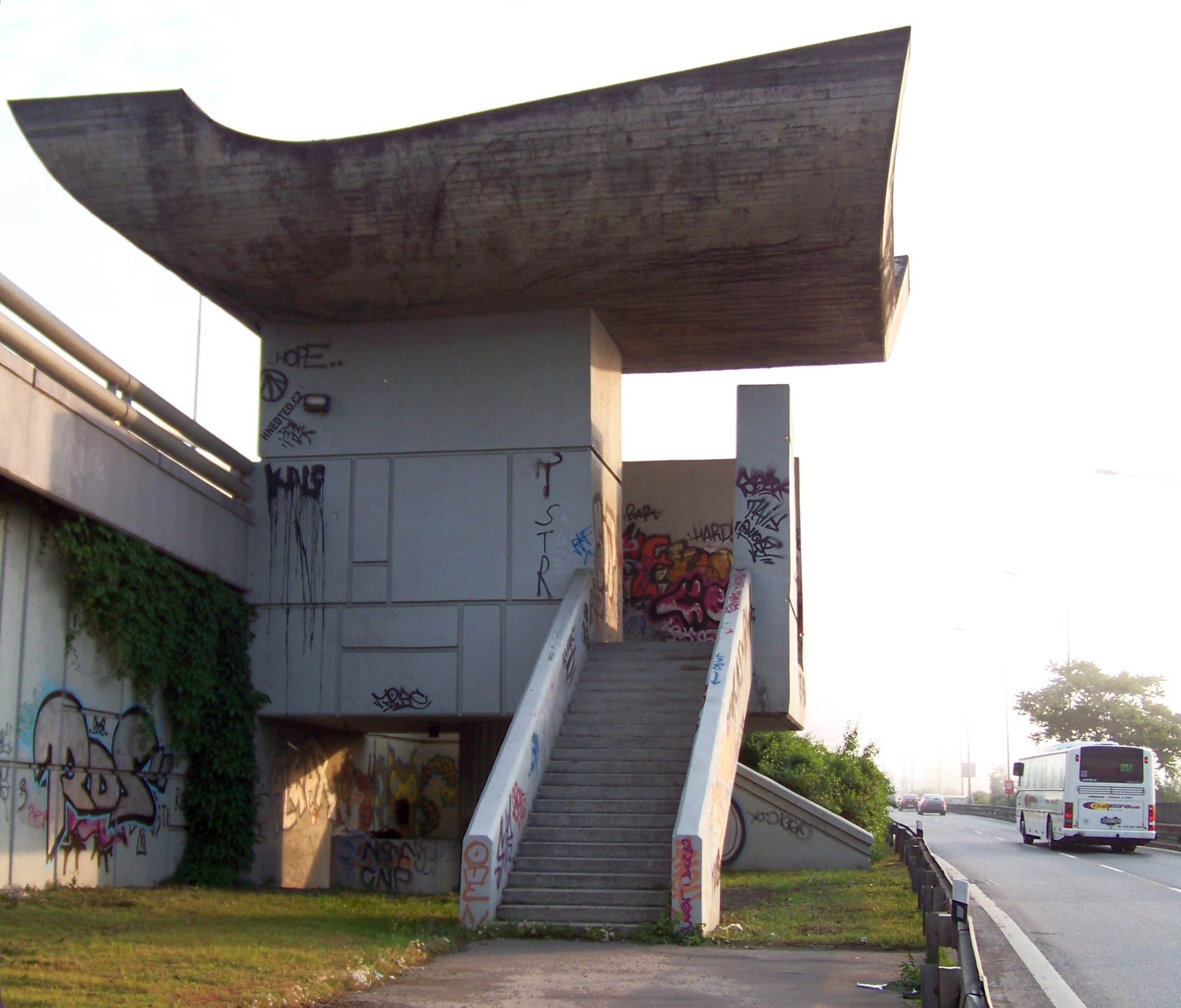
Concrete sculpture named "Hroší lázeň", meaning "hippo bath"

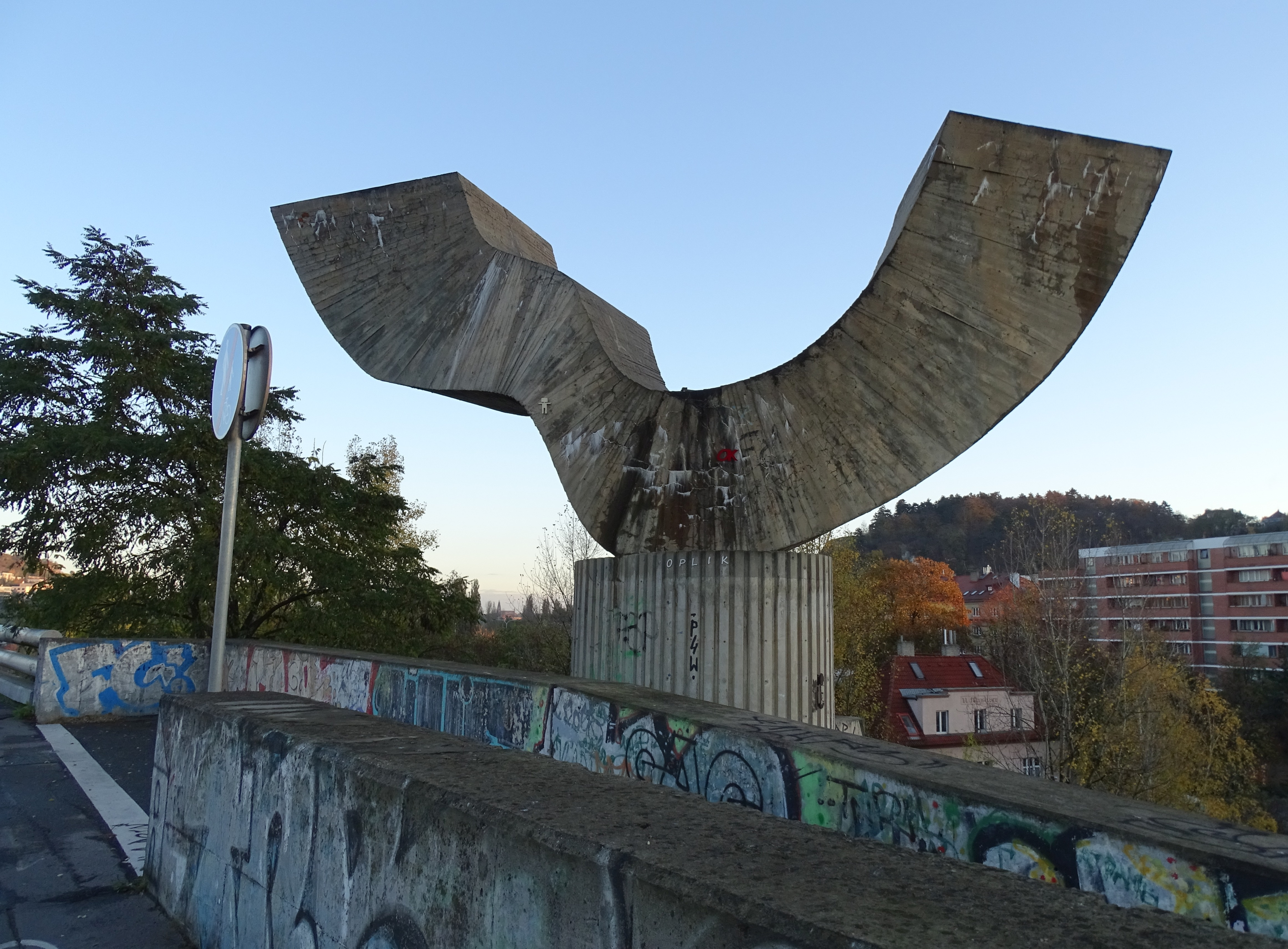
The sculpture Rovnováha ("Balance"), photographed in 2016, before its collapse in 2026

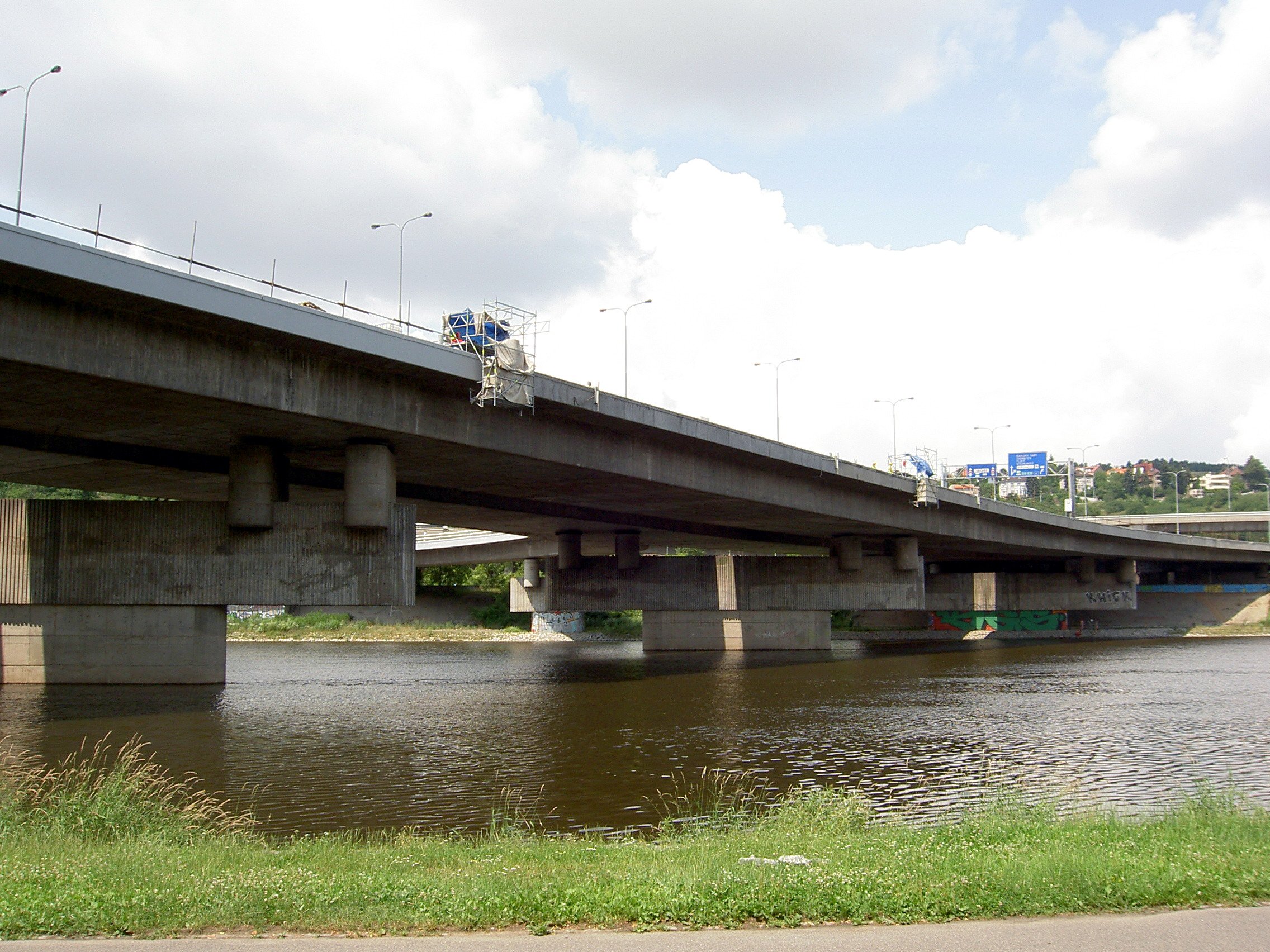
View from riverbank

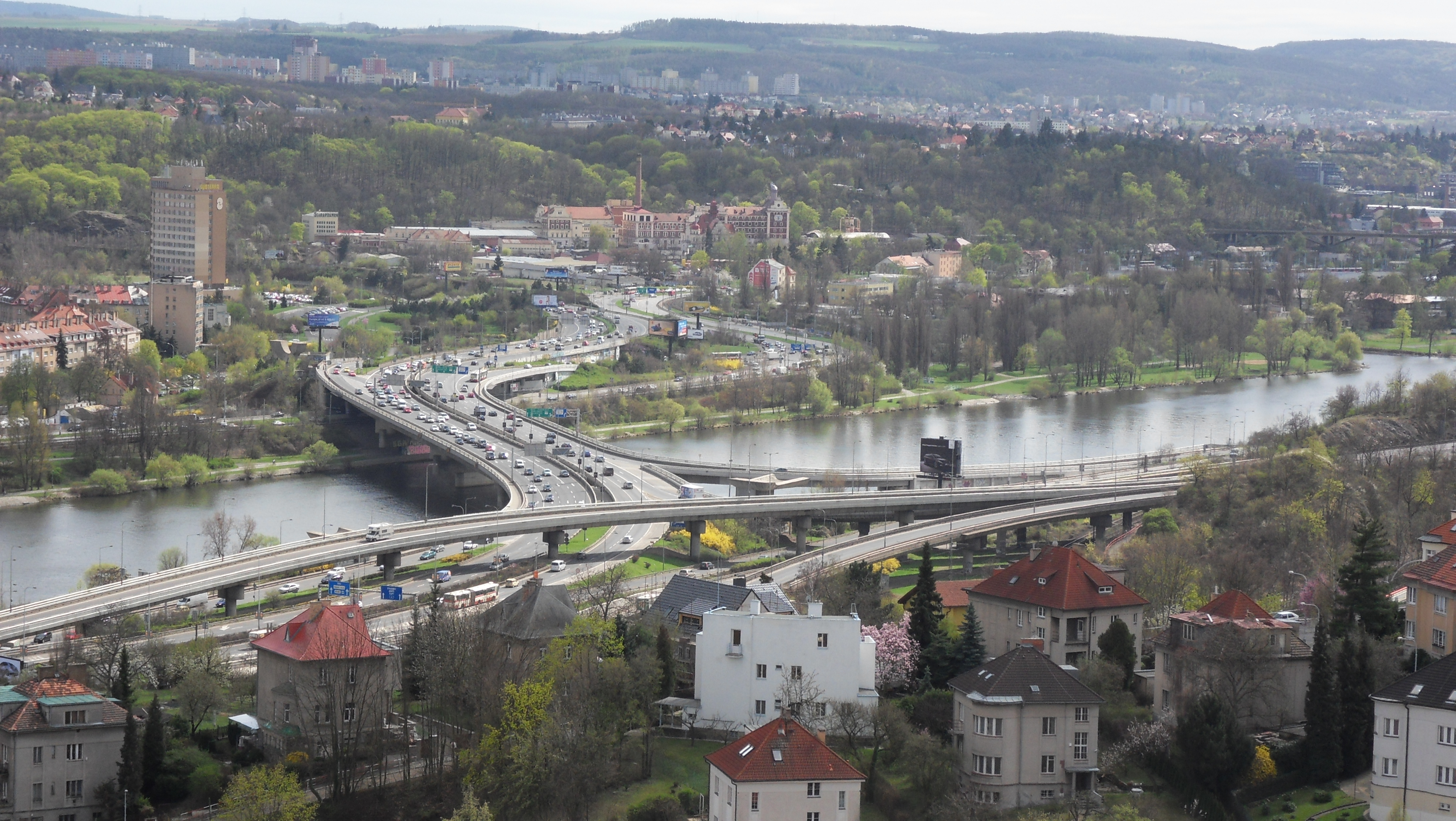
Remote view
