= Lítačka =

Municipal smart card in Prague

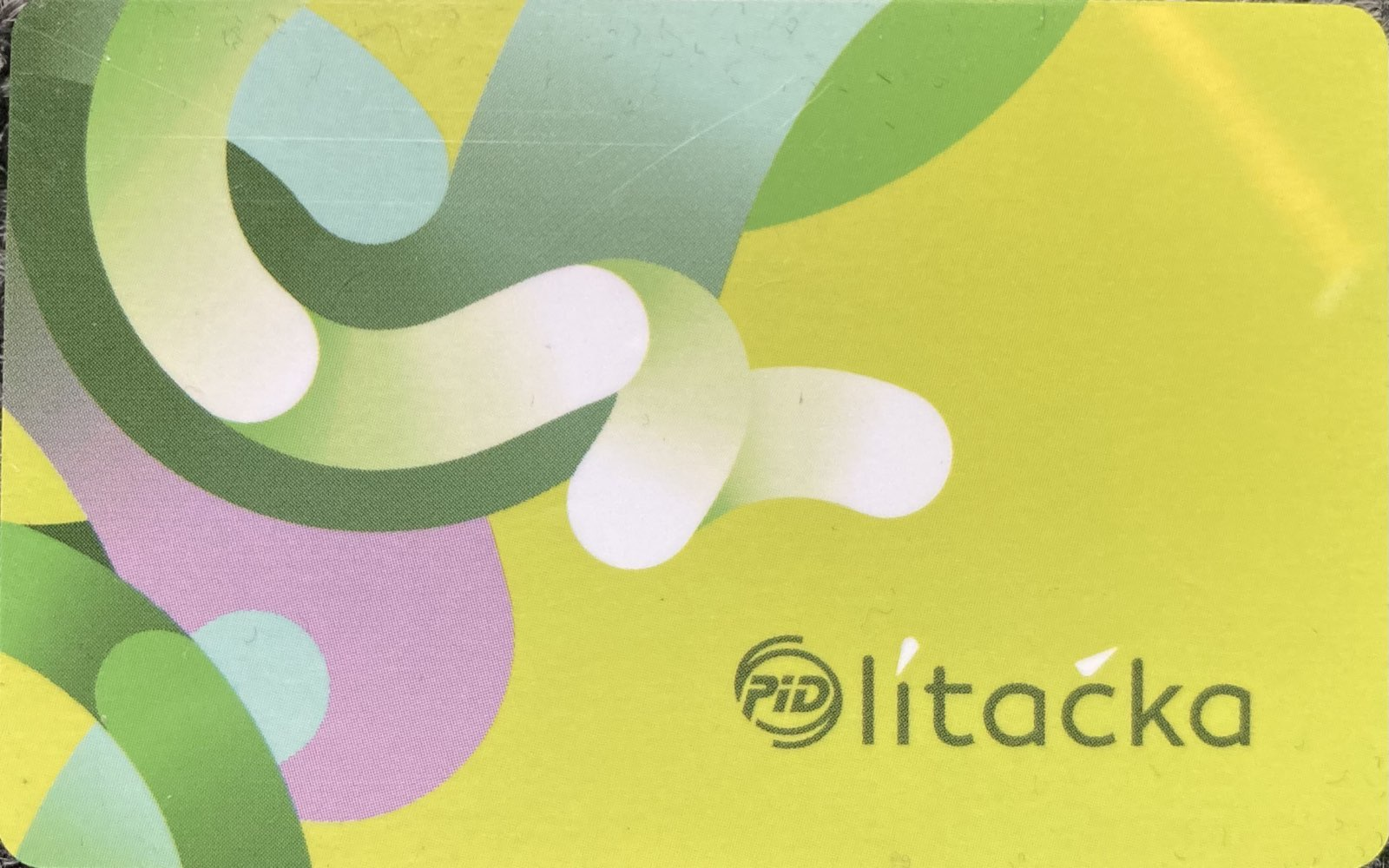
- Location: Prague, Czech Republic
- Launched: 2016
- Technology: Contactless smart card with chip
- Operator: Prague City Hall
- Validity: Prague Integrated Transport, Municipal Library of Prague, Czech National Library of Technology, various discounts.
- Variants: Registered personal Lítačka, Anonymous Lítačka.
- Website: www.pidlitacka.cz

Lítačka (Czech pronunciation: [ˈliːtatʃka]) is a contactless smart card used for public transport in Prague and the Central Bohemian Region. It is part of the Prague Integrated Transport (PID) ticketing system and is administered by the Prague-owned company Operátor ICT.

Lítačka was introduced in 2016 as a replacement for Opencard. Since 2018, PID Lítačka has developed into a wider ticketing service that also allows passengers to use supported contactless bank cards, the In Karta of České dráhy, or a mobile phone for long-term tickets.

The PID Lítačka mobile app can be used to buy individual tickets, manage season tickets and plan journeys. It provides departure and disruption information and can be used to pay for parking in Prague.

== History ==
Lítačka was introduced in 2016 to replace Opencard, Prague's previous city card. Prague had become dependent on software and certificates controlled by eMoneyServices, which caused problems with issuing new Opencards. In January 2016, the city announced a new card system intended to reduce this dependence. Lítačka cards began to be issued on 1 March 2016 by the city-owned company Operátor ICT. Existing Opencards remained valid until they expired.

In August 2018, Lítačka became part of a new ticketing system for Prague Integrated Transport in Prague and the Central Bohemian Region. Passengers could use a Lítačka card, a supported contactless bank card or the In Karta of České dráhy to show that they had a valid season ticket. A new online shop and the PID Lítačka mobile app were introduced at the same time. The app also allowed passengers to buy and activate individual tickets.

In December 2019, season tickets could also be used directly through the mobile app. Passengers no longer needed to carry a physical Lítačka or another registered card when using the app.
