= Opencard =

Smart card system in Prague, Czech Republic

- Location: Prague
- Launched: April 12, 2007
- Discontinued: February 29, 2020
- Successor: Lítačka
- Technology: MIFARE Classic; MIFARE DESFire
- Manager: City of Prague
- Validity: Prague Integrated Transport; Paid parking; Municipal Library of Prague; National Library of Technology
- Variants: Personal with registered data; Personal without registered data; Anonymous

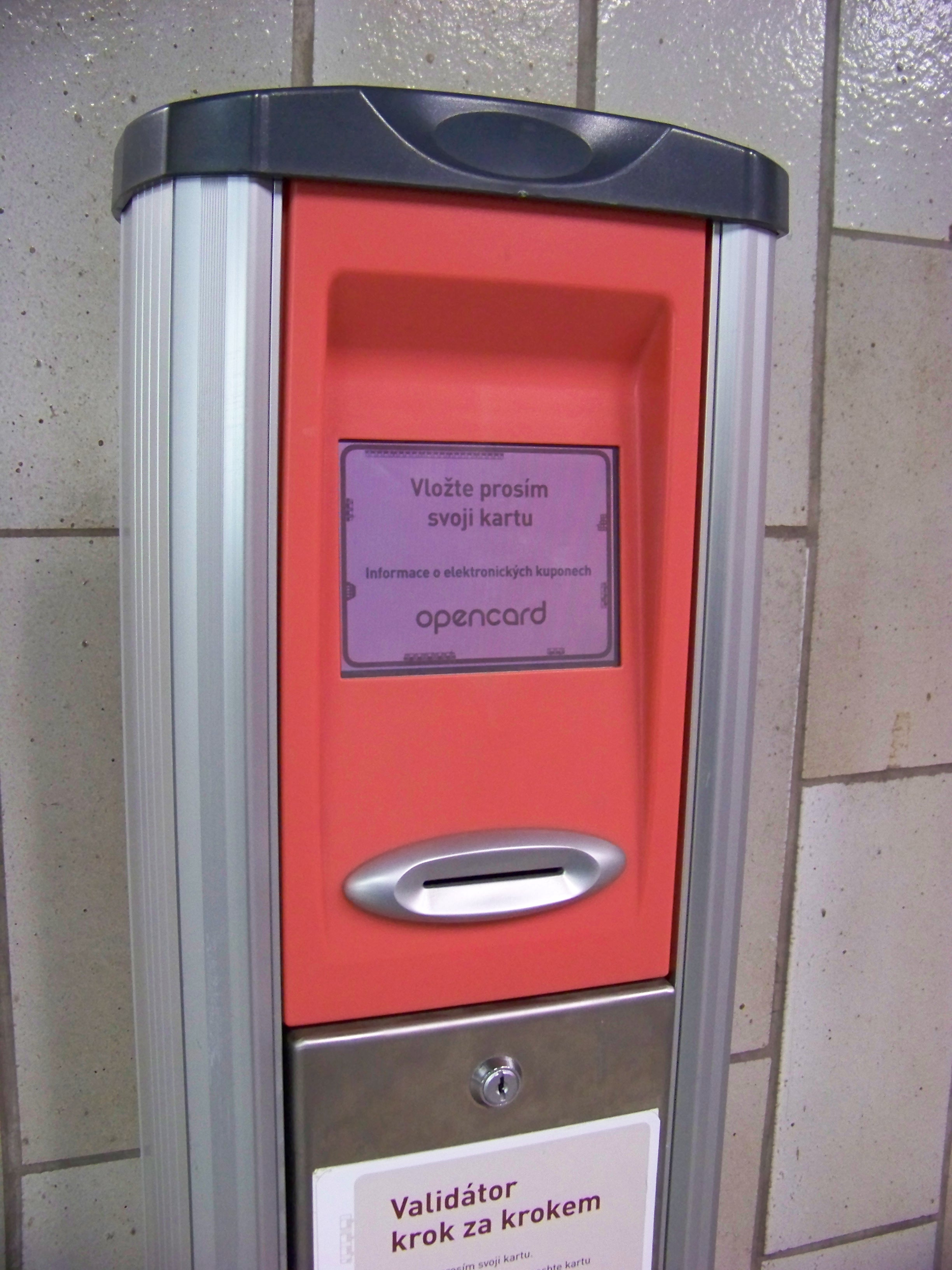
Opencard validator at Smíchovské nádraží metro station.

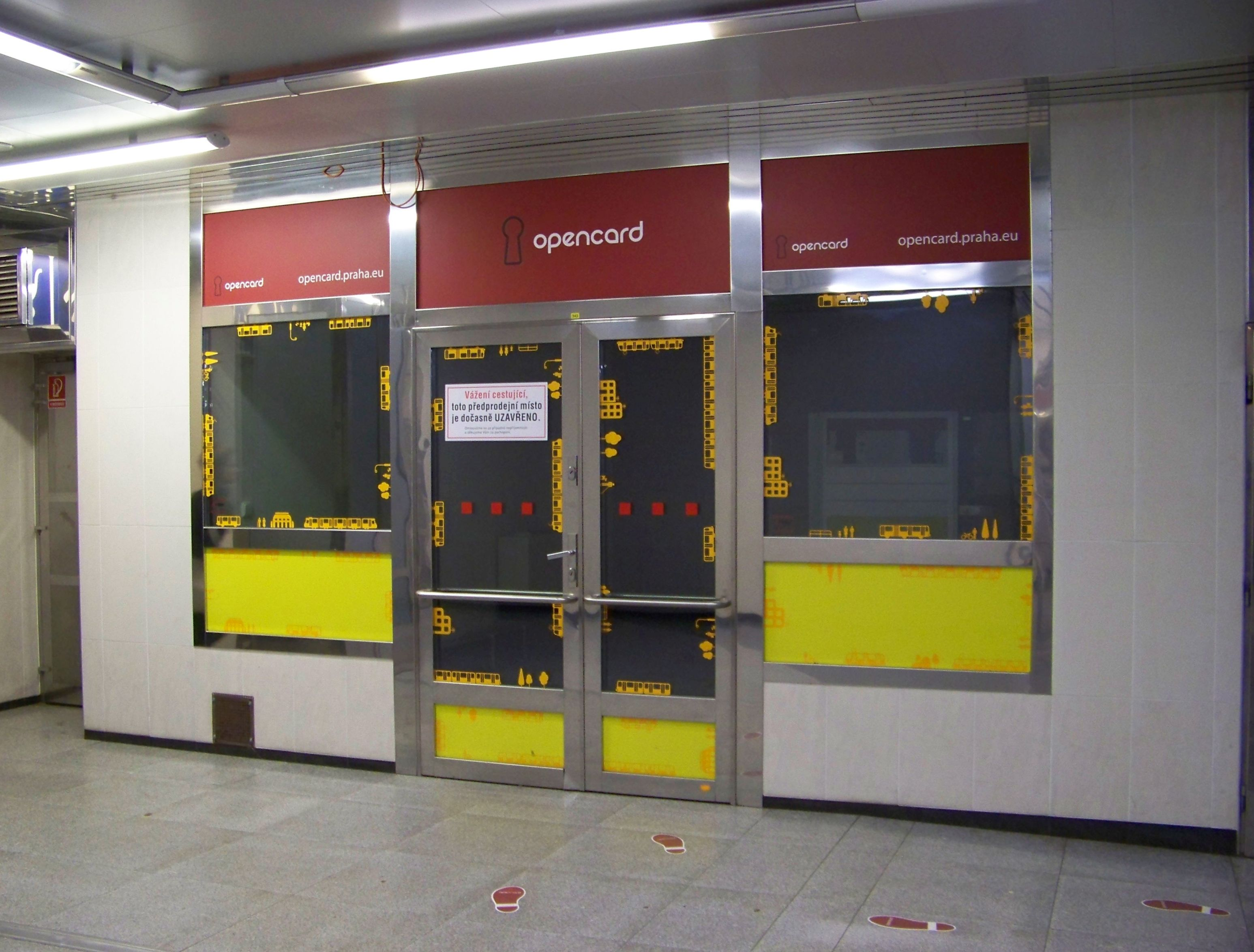
Opencard office at Letňany metro station.

Opencard was a municipal contactless smart card system used in Prague, Czech Republic, between 2007 and 2020. It entered public use in April 2007, initially for paid parking; and later began to serve as a library card at the Municipal Library of Prague. In 2008, it was expanded to carry electronic season tickets for Prague Integrated Transport.

The project became controversial over its high cost, violations of public procurement rules and Prague's dependence on proprietary technology supplied by private contractors.

Prague ultimately spent about CZK 1.74 billion on Opencard. Criminal proceedings connected with the project resulted in both convictions and acquittals.

Prague began replacing Opencard with the Lítačka card in March 2016 and from November 2018, new public-transport tickets could no longer be used with the card. The last Opencard expired in February 2020.

== History ==
=== Launch and expansion ===
Prague approved the Opencard project in October 2005 as a multi-purpose smart card for municipal services, including public transport, libraries and paid parking. Public pilot operation began on 12 April 2007, with an initial issue of 50,000 cards. Paid parking in central Prague was the first available application. From 1 June 2007, Opencard could also be used as a library card at the Municipal Library of Prague.

Public transport soon became the card's main use. In August 2008, electronic season tickets for Prague Integrated Transport were introduced on Opencard. By the end of the year, the Prague Public Transit Company had received 312,489 applications for electronic fares. In January 2009, ordinary annual paper passes were withdrawn, making Opencard the standard carrier for annual public-transport passes in Prague and contributing to a rapid increase in adoption.

=== Replacement by Lítačka ===
In January 2016, Prague announced that Opencard would be replaced by a new municipal card, Lítačka. The new card began to be issued on 1 March 2016, while existing Opencards remained valid and did not need to be exchanged immediately. In July 2017, Prague closed the Prague Card Services Centre, ending the infrastructure used to issue Opencards.

The phase-out continued over the following years. From late 2018, new Prague Integrated Transport season tickets could no longer be loaded onto Opencard, although tickets already stored on the cards remained valid until they expired. The last Opencard expired on 29 February 2020.

== Functions and technology ==
Although Opencard was designed as a multi-purpose municipal smart card, its main use became public transport. It could store electronic season tickets for Prague Integrated Transport, and by the early 2010s around 700,000 active transport passes were linked to Opencards.

The card could also be used for paid parking and as identification at the Municipal Library of Prague, where it could replace a conventional library card. It was also accepted as a customer card by the National Library of Technology. Prague additionally operated a discount programme for Opencard holders.

Opencard was also available in anonymous versions. From 2012, Prague also offered a personal card whose holder's name and photograph appeared on the card without their personal data being stored in the central database. The system used MIFARE contactless-card technology, including MIFARE DESFire and later MIFARE DESFire EV1.

== Controversy and costs ==
Concerns about the cost and management of Opencard grew during 2009, as a forensic audit commissioned by Prague found that the city had spent CZK 888 million on the project by the end of June. The auditors concluded that the level of spending did not correspond to the functionality available at the time and criticised the project's planning and management.

Another source of controversy was Prague's dependence on proprietary software and licences controlled by private contractors, particularly Haguess. The Office for the Protection of Competition found that Prague and the Prague Public Transit Company had violated public procurement rules in several contracts connected with Opencard. In 2013, it confirmed fines of CZK 600,000 for Prague and CZK 500,000 for the transport company. The Supreme Administrative Court later upheld key findings concerning the city's dependence on a single supplier.

The city gradually tried to reduce its reliance on external contractors. In February 2011, Prague took over operation of the Prague Card Services Centre from Haguess. In June 2014, it also assumed responsibility for technical support previously provided by eMoneyServices, although the city still lacked licences allowing it to freely modify the underlying software. By 2016, Prague estimated that it had spent approximately CZK 1.74 billion on the system.

== Legal proceedings ==
Several criminal proceedings arose from contracts connected with Opencard. In one case, former Prague IT director Ivan Seyček and municipal official Jiří Chytil were convicted over contracts with Haguess relating to the Prague Card Services Centre. Seyček was sentenced to three and a half years in prison, while Chytil received an 18-month suspended sentence. In June 2016, the Supreme Court rejected their appeals.

A separate case involved former Prague Public Transit Company managers Tomáš Petana and Jan Suntych over contracts for software used by Opencard. Both initially received suspended sentences, but the Supreme Court acquitted them in May 2018, finding that they had not breached their duties either intentionally or through negligence.

Another proceeding concerned contracts approved by Prague's leadership in 2012. Former mayor Tomáš Hudeček, former councillors Eva Vorlíčková and Josef Nosek, and municipal official Jan Teska were initially convicted, but the judgments were overturned on appeal. All four were acquitted in 2020, with the verdict becoming final after the prosecution declined to appeal. Proceedings against former mayor Bohuslav Svoboda continued separately because of his parliamentary immunity. He was finally acquitted in June 2022, when an appeals court concluded that the conduct for which he had been prosecuted did not constitute a criminal offence.
