= Clementinum =

Building complex in Prague, currently a library

Coordinates: 50°05′12″N 14°24′59″E

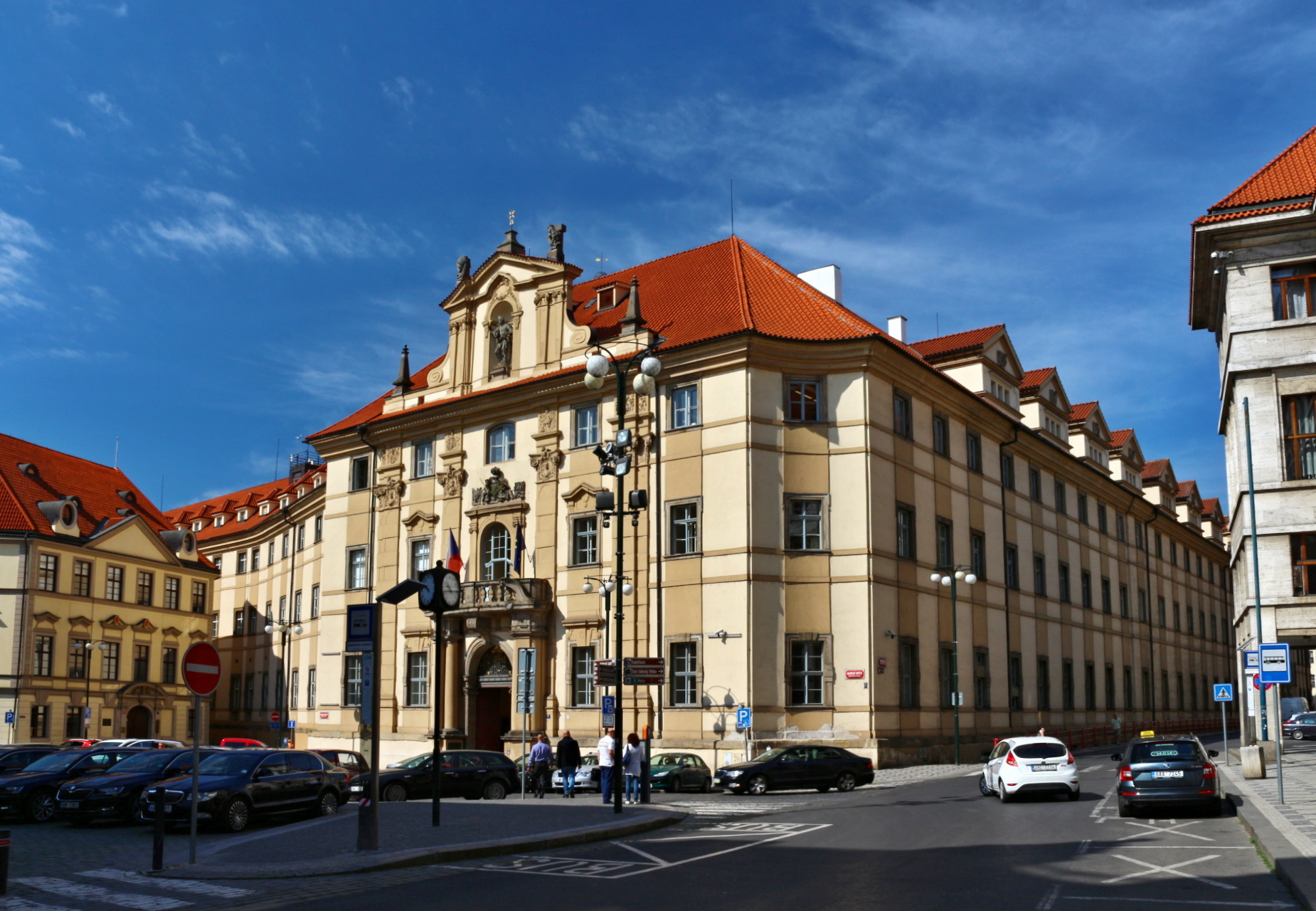
East entrance of the Clementinum

The Clementinum (Czech: Klementinum) is a historic complex of buildings in Prague which houses the National Library of the Czech Republic.

Until recently the complex hosted the National, University and Technical libraries; the City Library was also nearby on Mariánské Náměstí. In 2009, the Technical library moved to the Prague National Technical Library at Technická 6. The Municipal library is located in the adjacent building on Mariánské Náměstí, where the famous Idiom installation (known as the book tower) can be found in the foyer.

== History ==
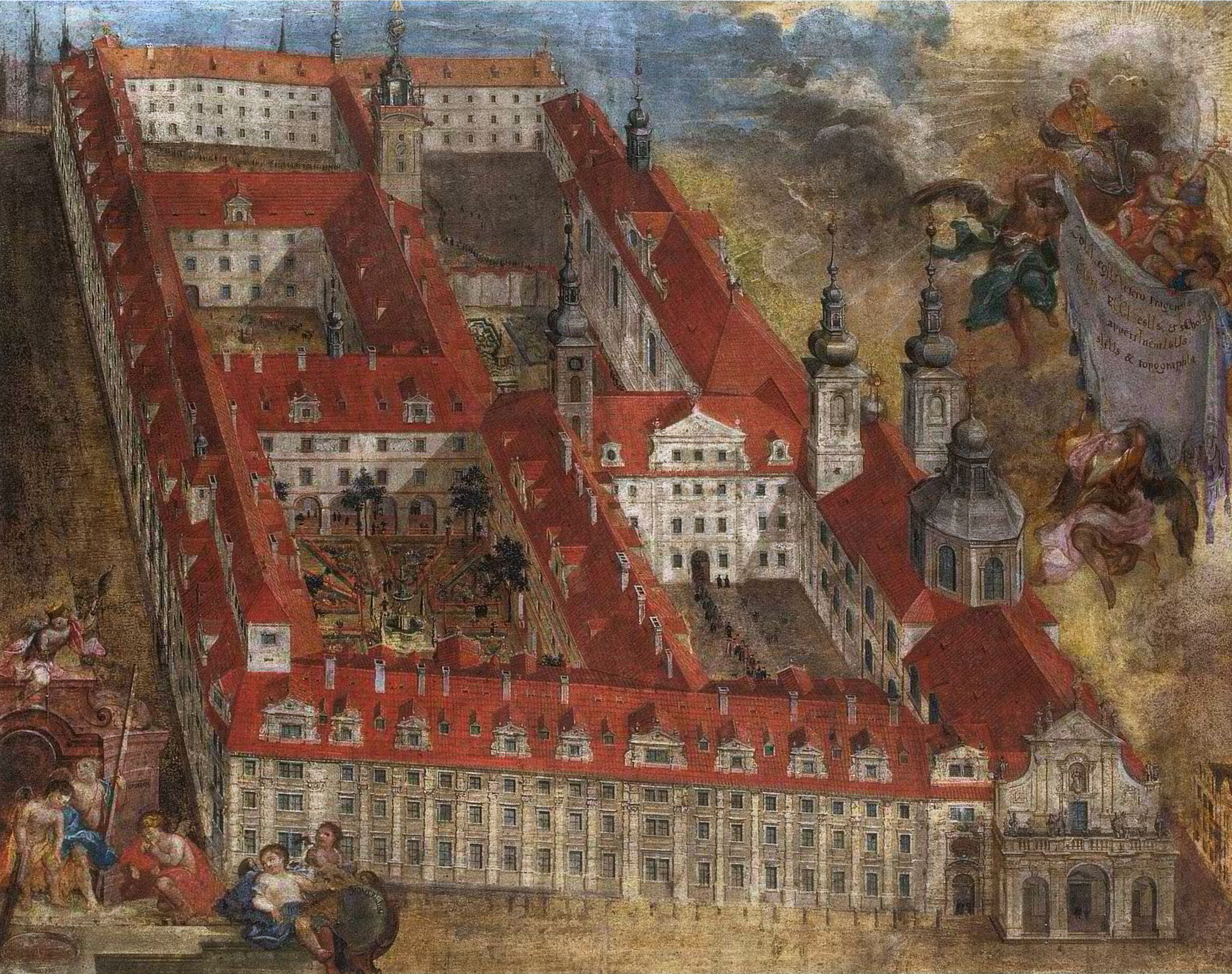
Historical painting of Clementinum, a large Baroque architectural complex, painted by Johann Hiebel in 1730.

Its history dates from the existence of a chapel dedicated to Saint Clement in the 11th century. A Dominican monastery was founded in the medieval period, which was heavily damaged in 1420 during the Hussite Wars and later transformed in 1556 to a Jesuit college. In 1622 the Jesuits transferred the library of Charles University to the Clementinum, and the college was merged with the University in 1654. The main building phase of Clementinum was in the years 1709–1726, during which the Baroque library was built. The Jesuits remained until their suppression in 1773, when the Clementinum was established as an observatory, library, and university by the Empress Maria Theresa of Austria.

The National Library was founded in 1781 and from 1782 the Clementinum was a legal deposit library.

In 1791, the Clementinum was the site of the first World's Fair. This industrial exhibition was held to celebrate the coronation of Leopold II as king of Bohemia, and served to highlight the sophistication of manufacturing in Czech lands during that period.

In 1918 the newly established Czecho-Slovak state took over the library. Since 1990, it has been the National Library. It contains a collection of Mozartiana, material pertaining to Tycho Brahe and Comenius, as well as historic examples of Czech literature. The architecture is a notable example of Baroque architecture and the Clementinum, covering 20,000 square metres, is the second largest complex of buildings in Prague after Prague Castle.

For several years before 2006, there was an ongoing debate on the possibilities of expanding the space for future library collections, as space in the current Clementinum buildings was expected to reach its limit by 2010. On 10 January 2006, the Prague authorities decided to sell the city-owned property located in the area of Letná, near the centre of Prague, to the National Library. In Spring 2006, an international architectural design competition for the new building was put up. The architect who won the competition was Jan Kaplický, but the decision was overruled, so the Czech National Library is still waiting for its final project.

In 2005, the Czech National Library received the UNESCO Jikji prize (Memory of the World).

Since 2023, Prague City Tourism, a. s., a company owned by the City of Prague, runs the baroque route in the Clementinum which includes the Baroque library and the Astronomical tower.

== Curiosities ==
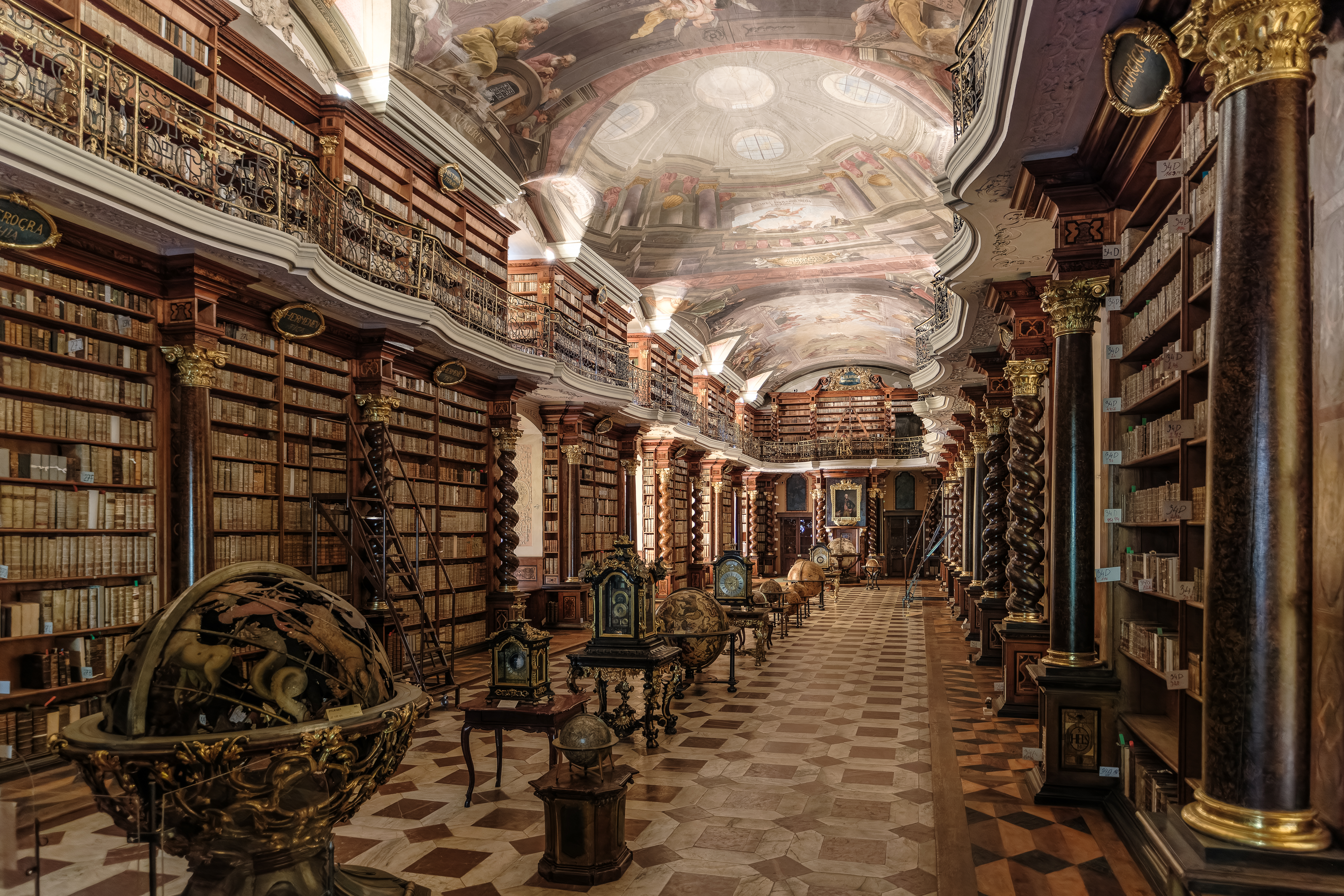
Baroque library hall

- At one time the Clementinum was known as the third-largest Jesuit college in the world.
- The oldest weather recording in the area of the Czech lands started in Clementinum in the year 1775. The recording continues through the present day.
- The Clementinum is mentioned in a 1943 short story "The Secret Miracle" by Jorge Luis Borges. The protagonist has a dream of the Clementinum where the librarians look for God in the books. One of the librarians says: "God is in one of the letters of one of the pages of one of the four hundred thousand books of Clementinum. My fathers and the fathers of my fathers have looked for this letter; I myself have gone blind looking for it." A patron enters and delivers an atlas to the librarian, saying that it is useless. Opening the book at random, the dreamer sees the map of India and, touching one of its minuscule letters, finds God.
- The Baroque library hall inside Clementinum is known for its beautiful interior, including ceiling artwork by Jan Hiebl which shows the medieval depiction of human knowledge.

== Gallery ==
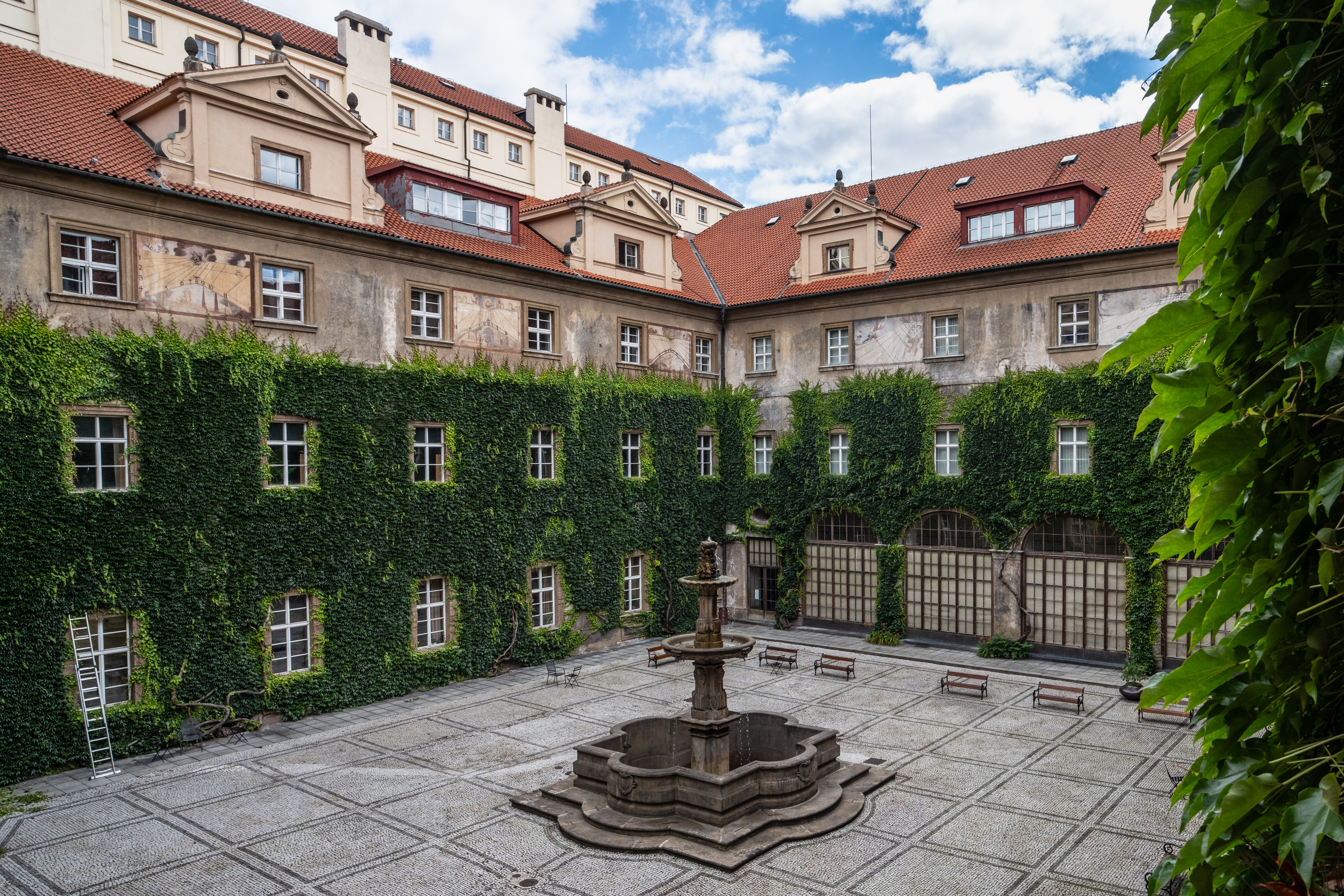
The Vine Courtyard (Révové nádvoří)

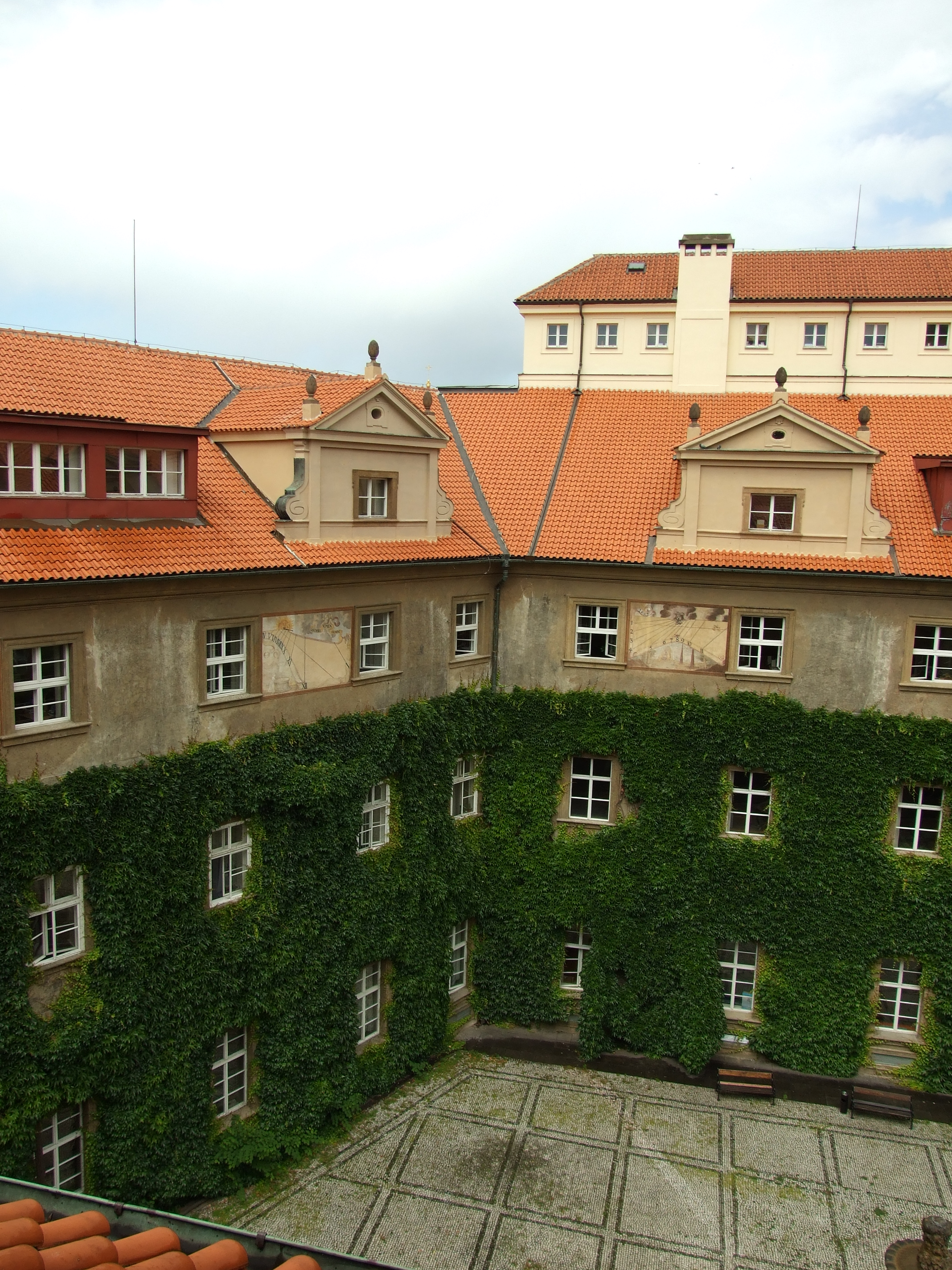
Prague Clementinum seen from top floor, where Slavic library is situated

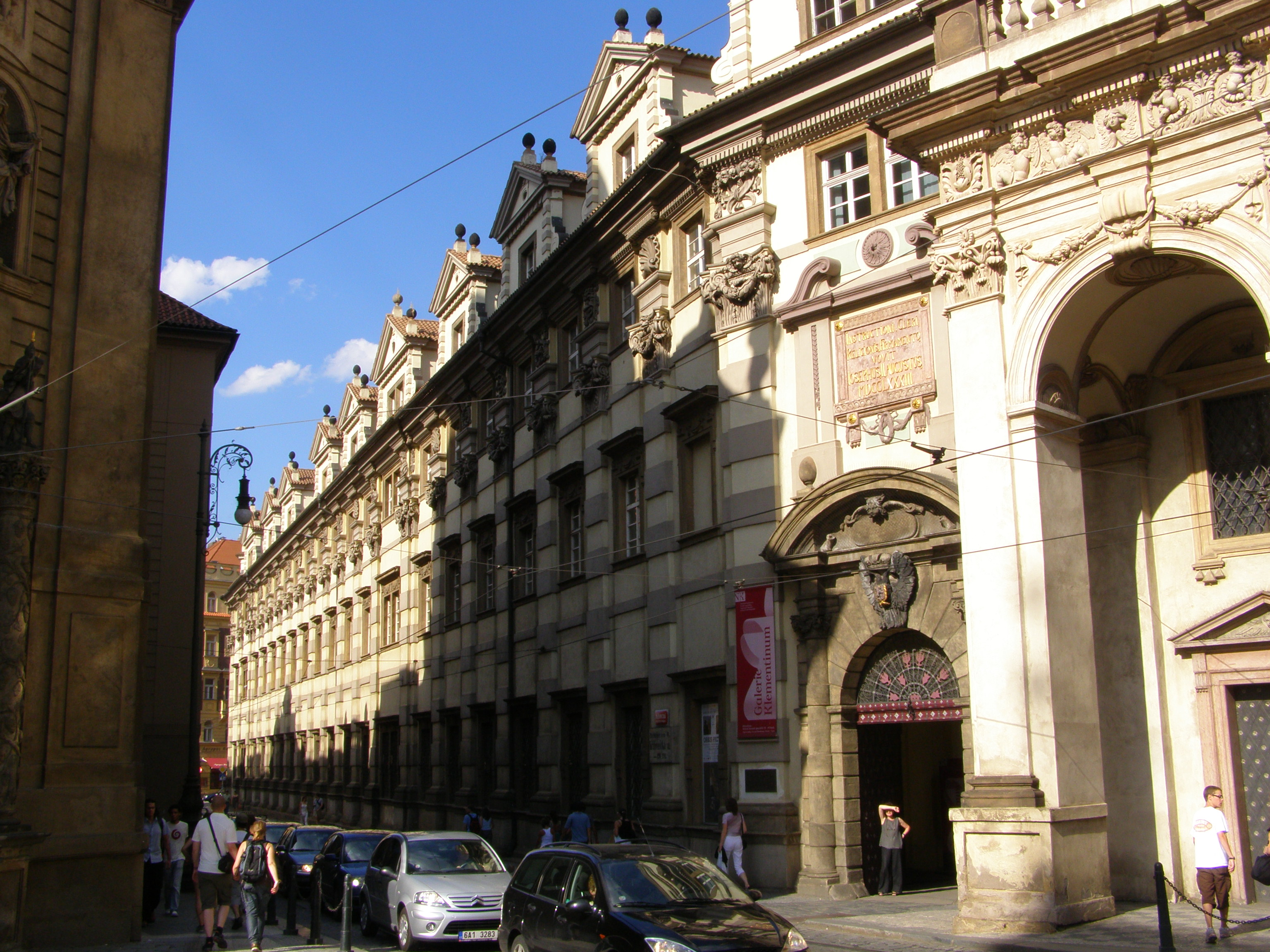
Entrance to the building from Křižovnická street

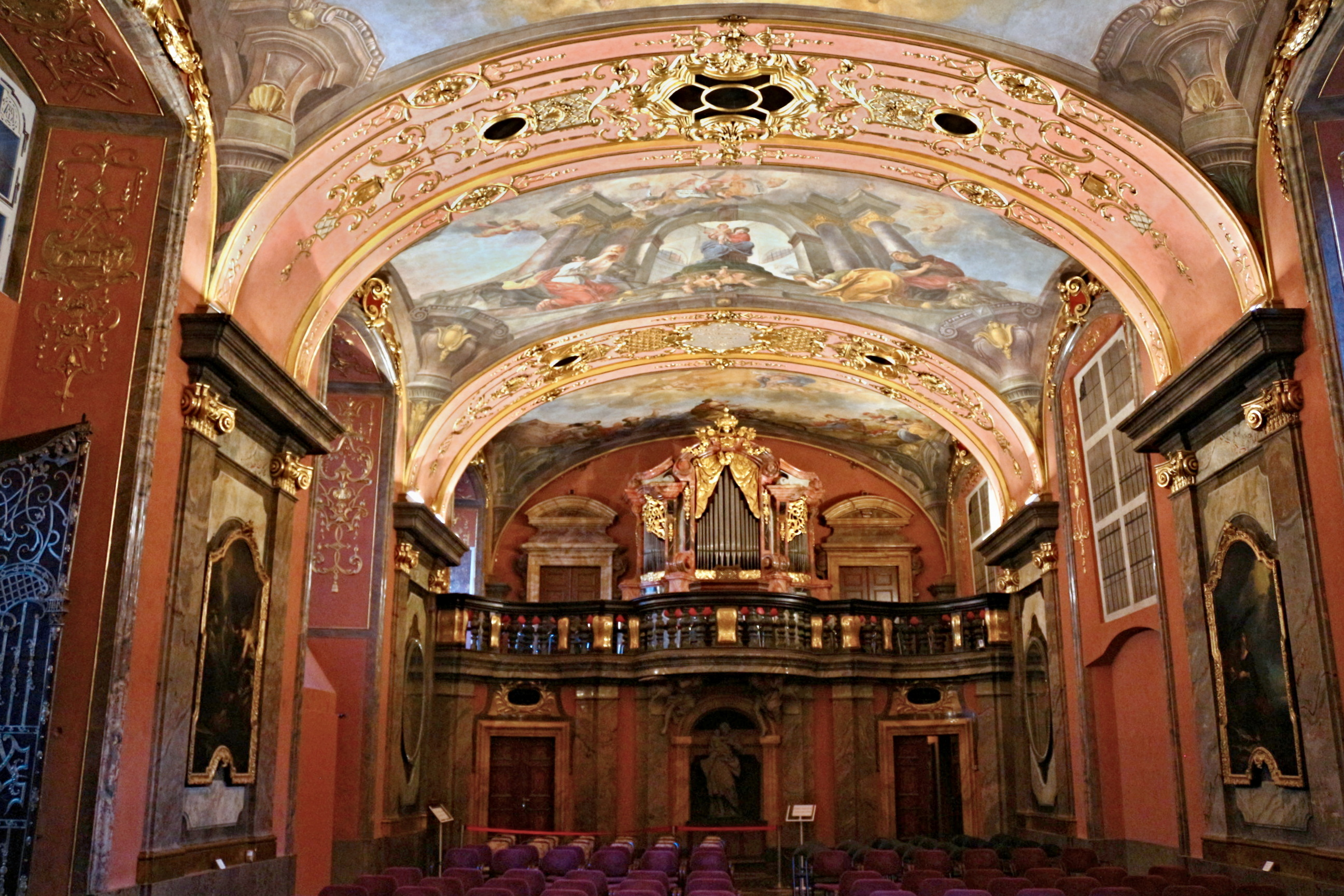
The Mirror Chapel

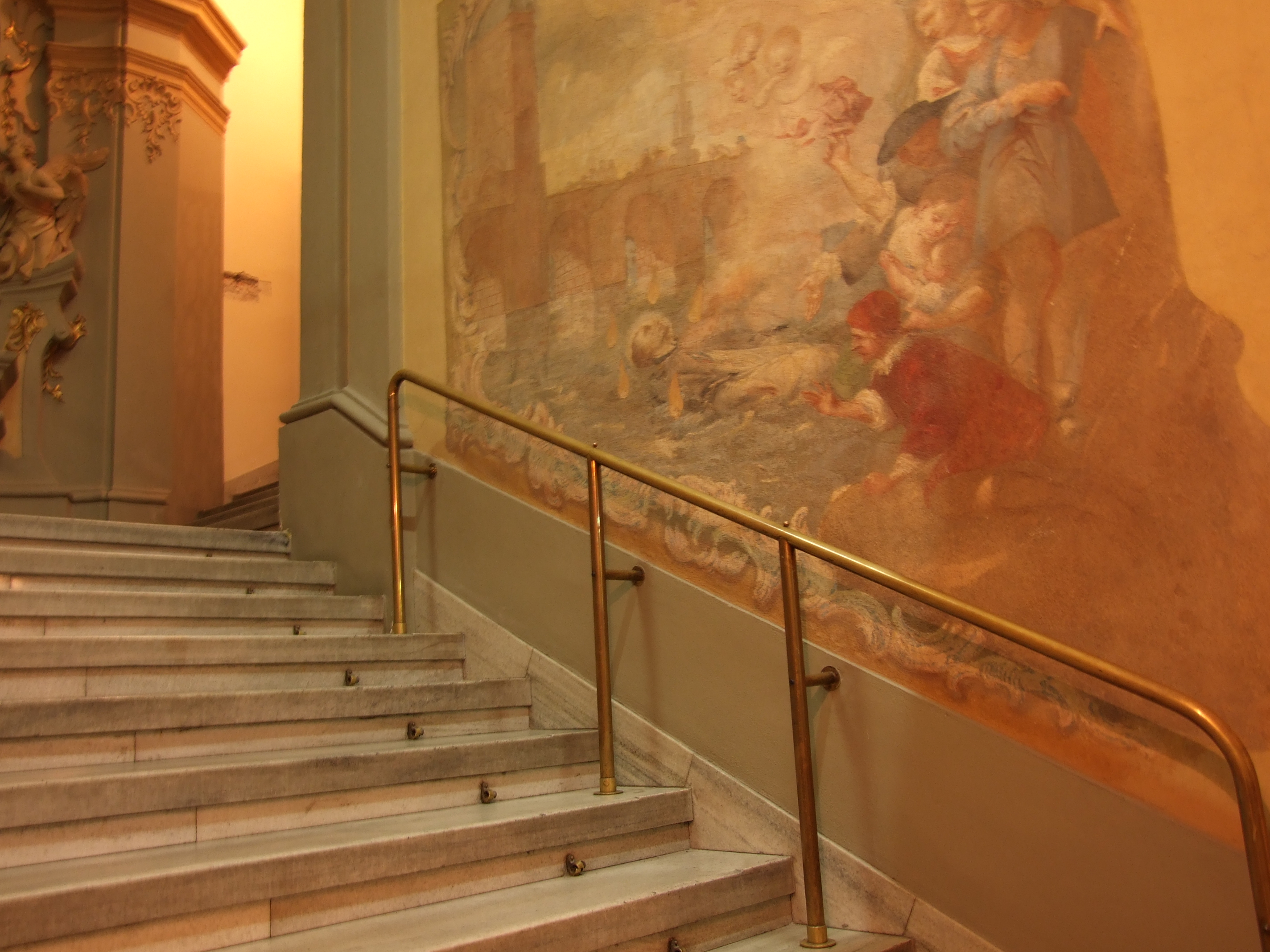
Inside the Clementinum, Old Town, Prague

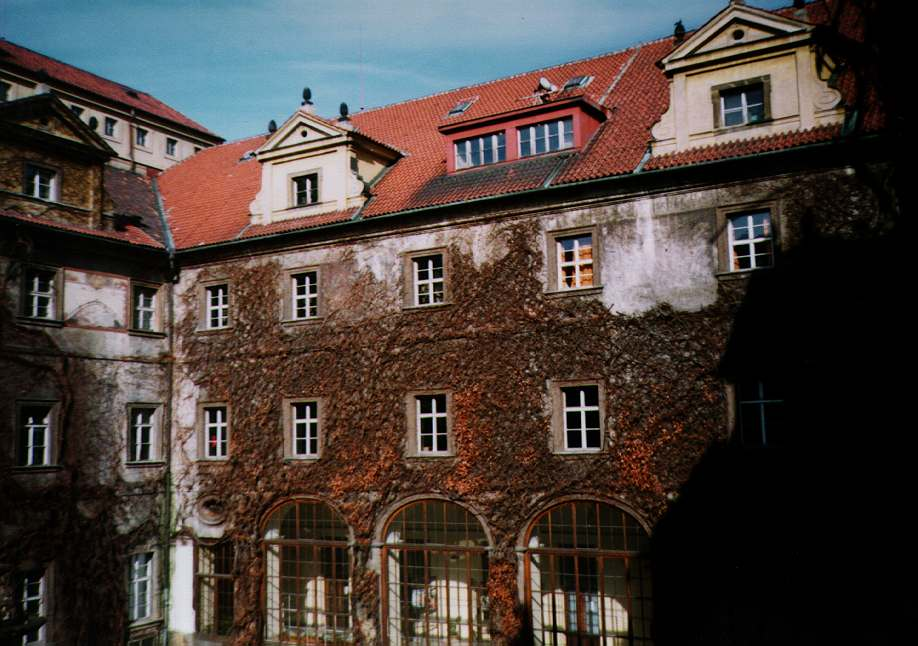
Wall with sundials, inside the Clementinum

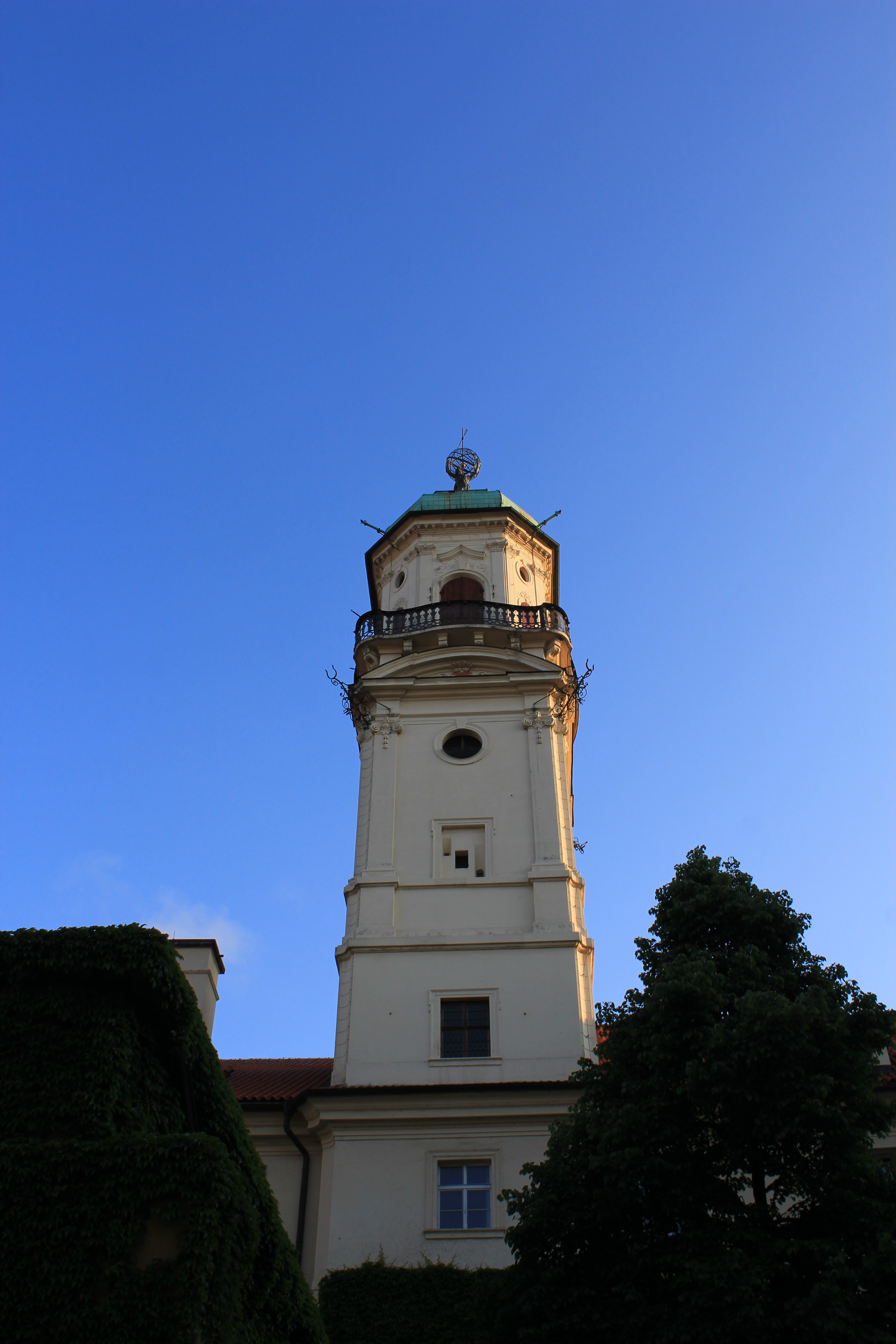
Astronomical tower

== See also ==
- List of early modern universities in Europe
- List of Jesuit sites
- Strahov Monastery
