= Czech National Library of Technology =

Library in Prague, Czech Republic

- Národní Technická Knihovna
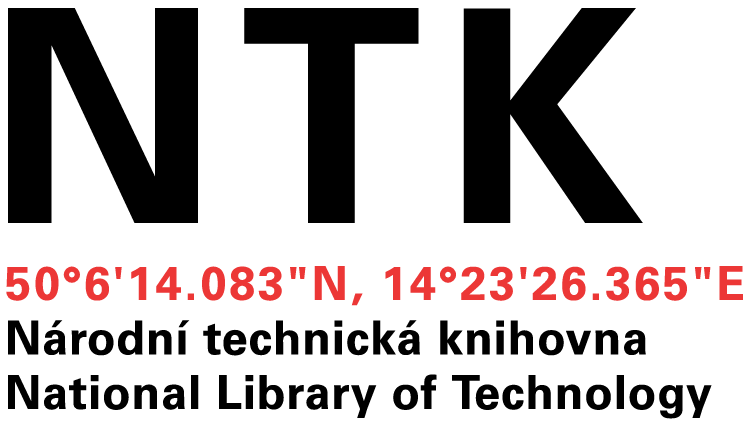
- 50.1039389°N 14.3906217°E
- Location: Technická 6; 160 80 Prague 6 – Dejvice, Czech Republic, Czech Republic
- Type: Research library
- Scope: Engineering, architecture, chemistry, computer science, mathematics, physics
- Established: 1718

Collection
- Items collected: Books, journals, electronic media
- Size: 1.18 million media units
- Legal deposit: No

Access and use
- Population served: Professors, students, researchers, private sector clients, general public
- Members: 25.5 thousand

Other information
- Budget: Kč321.3 million
- Director: Martin Svoboda
- Employees: 143 FTE
- Affiliation: CTU, UCT, CZU, IOCB
- Website: http://www.techlib.cz/en/

The Czech National Library of Technology (Czech: Národní technická knihovna, abbreviated as NTK) is located at Technická 6 in Prague 6. The building also houses a branch of the Municipal Library of Prague. The former site of the National Library of Technology was the Clementinum in the Old Town of Prague, from which all books and materials were moved to the library's current location after completion of the current building in 2009. The building was designed by architects Roman Brychta, Adam Halíř, Ondřej Hofmeister and Petr Lešek of Projektil Architekti after winning first prize in an architectural competition held in 2000.

Construction of the current building began in 2006 and was completed in January 2009. The library opened to the public on 9 September 2009 and now boasts the most extensive collection of Czech and international documents in the field of technology and applied natural and social sciences related to technology in the Czech Republic.

The user-friendly design philosophy for the building has been described as a "high-tech living room for students" by the institution's Director Martin Svoboda.

== History ==
Today's National Library of Technology in Prague originated in 1718 as a collection of books belonging to the first Engineering Professor of the Czech Estates, Christian Willenberg (1655-1731).

Over the next two centuries, the library grew as part of the Estates School of Engineering and other predecessors to the present-day Czech Technical University in Prague between 1786 and the outbreak of World War II in various locations. The library moved to the Clementinum as the Technical Universities Library (TUL) in 1935.

In 1960, the library was renamed as the State Library of Technology (STK). Over time, the library began to outgrow space available at the Clementinum. Two remote storage facilities were procured between 1974 and 1981 in Prague 4-Písnice and in Lhota near Dolní Břežany (each with capacity for 200,000 volumes), and in the late 1990s, the Czech Ministry of Education approved construction of the current building in Prague 6.

== Gallery ==
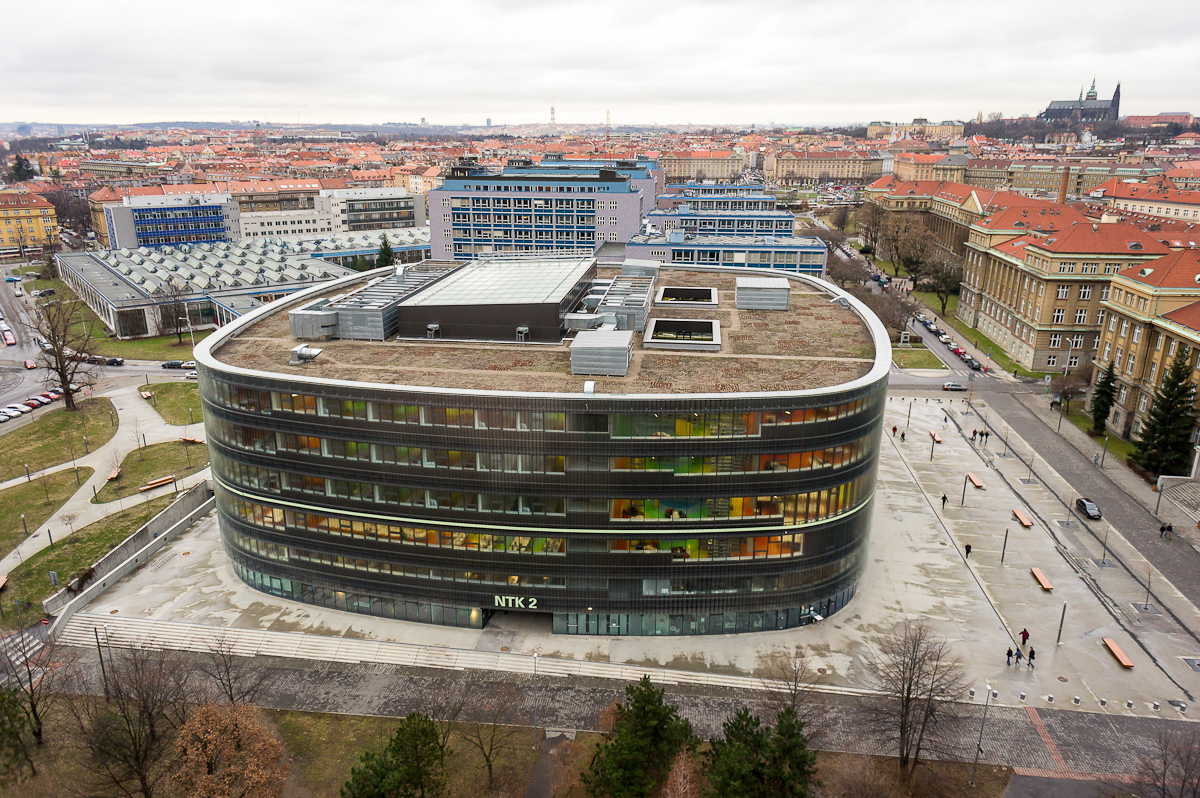
National Library of Technology in Prague (NTK) - a global view.

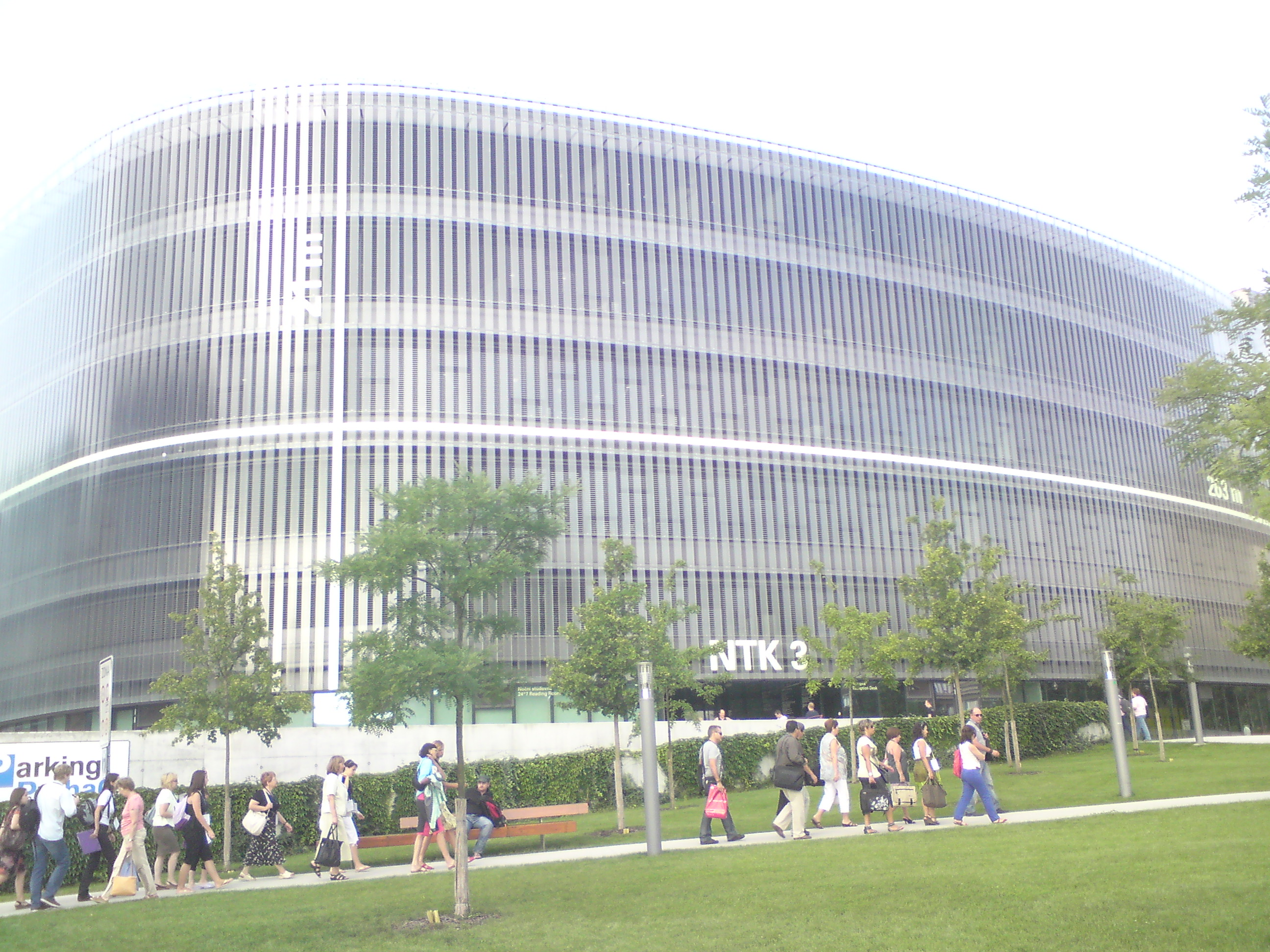
The glass-clad façade of the National Library of Technology.

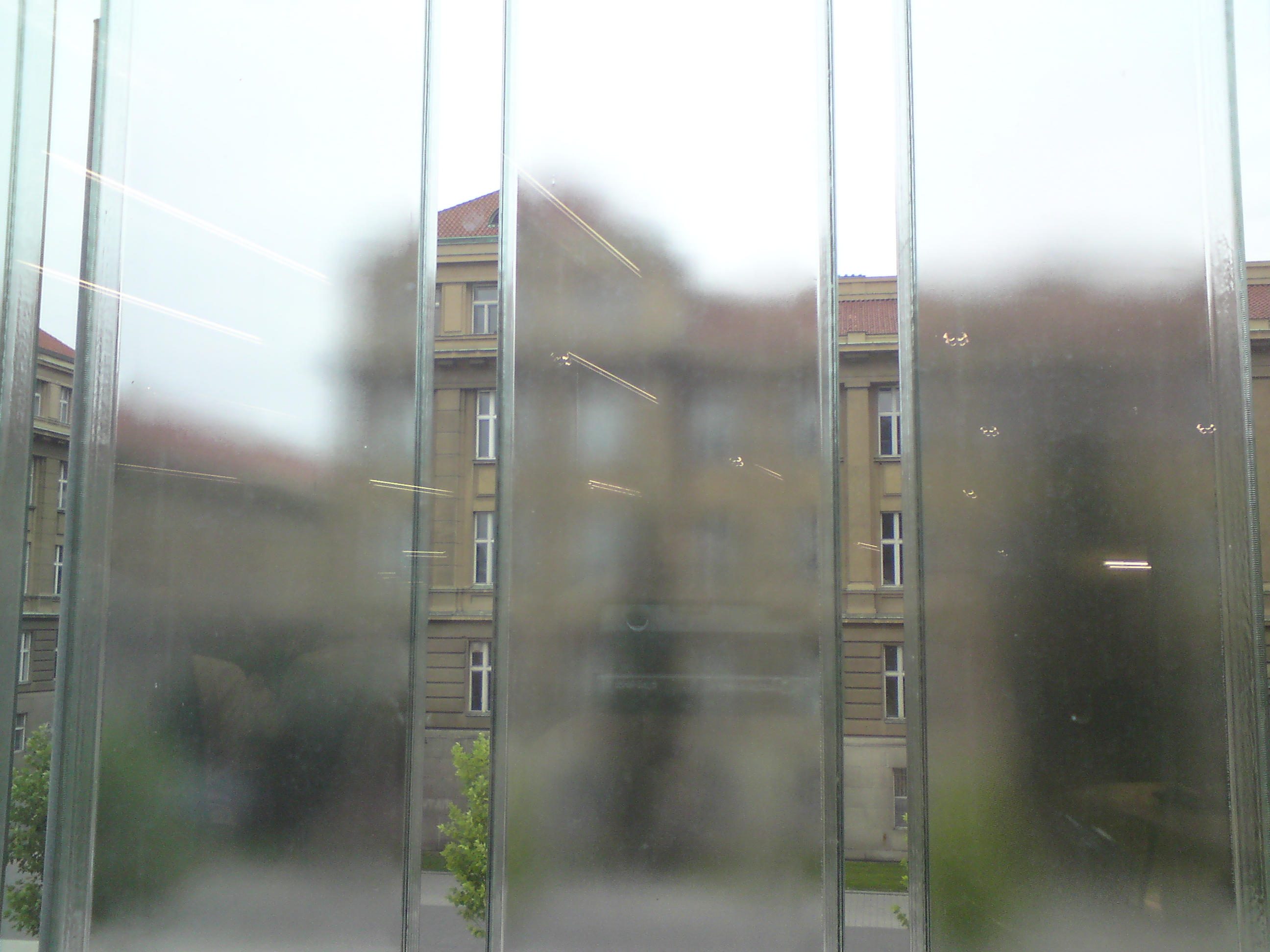
Glass cladding as viewed from inside the building.

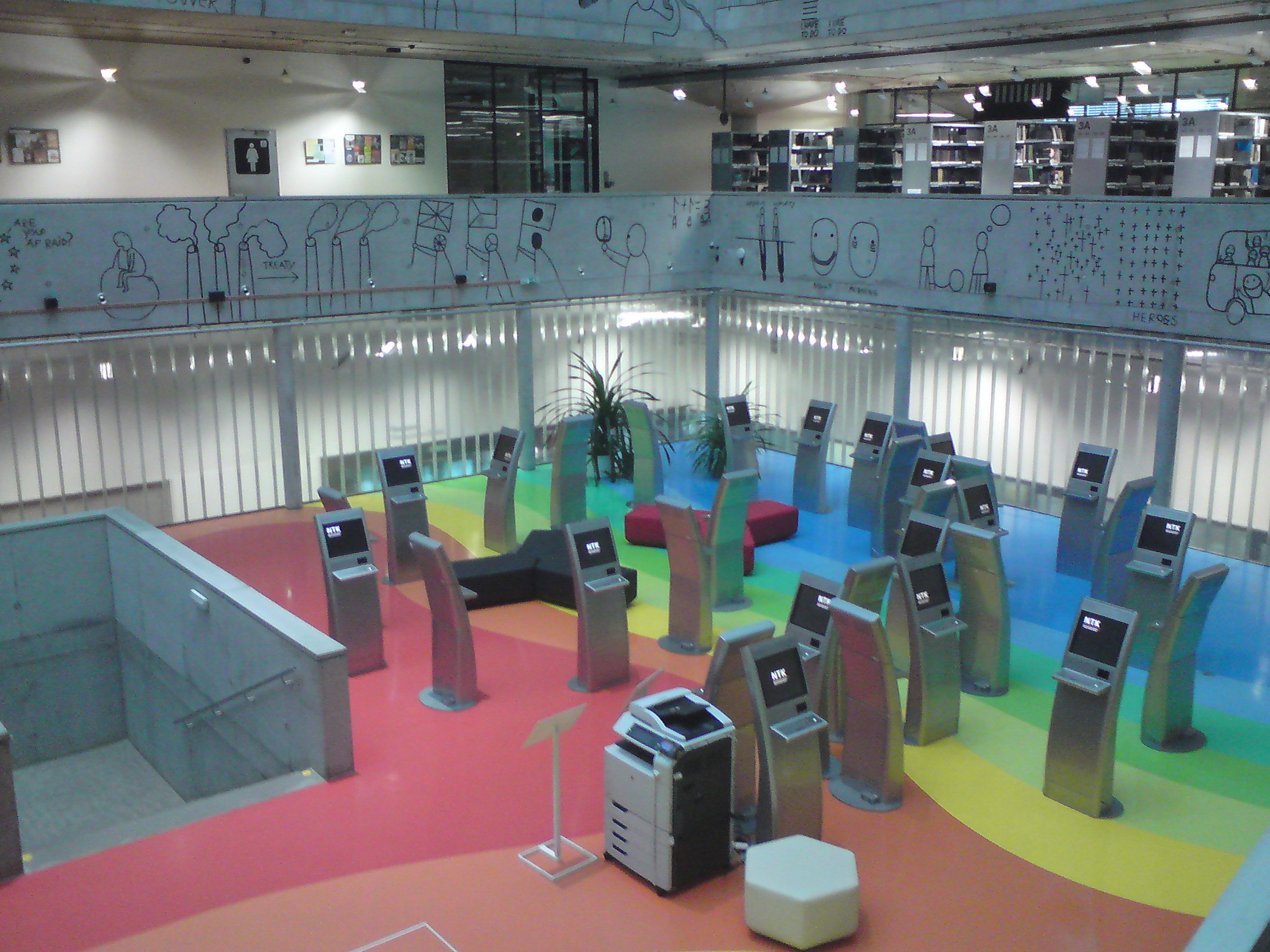
The card-operated information kiosks scattered throughout the building enable printing and catalogue searching.

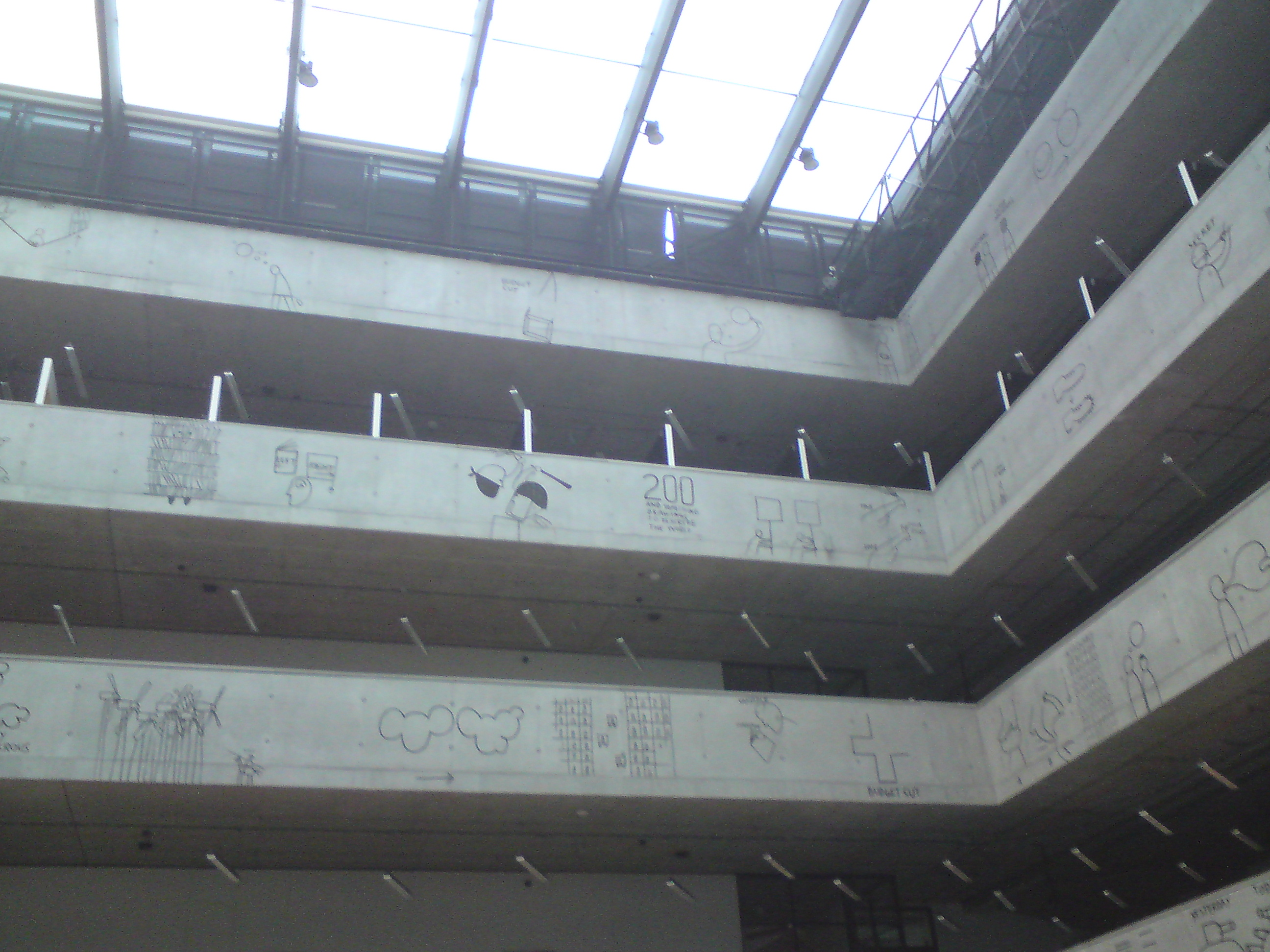
The atrium is naturally lit through the skylight.

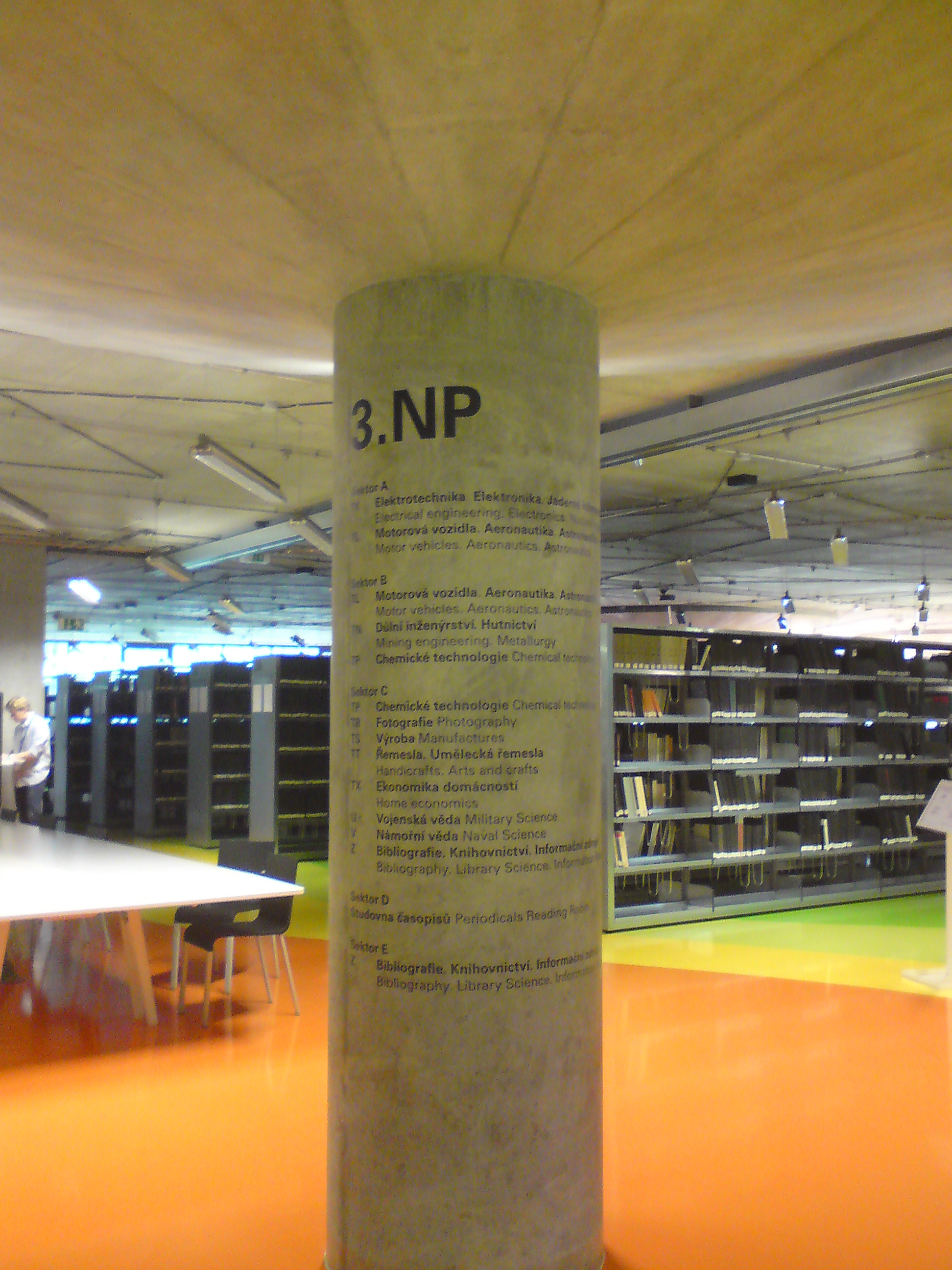
Thematic directory stenciled on the bare concrete column. Almost all surfaces throughout the building are exposed concrete.

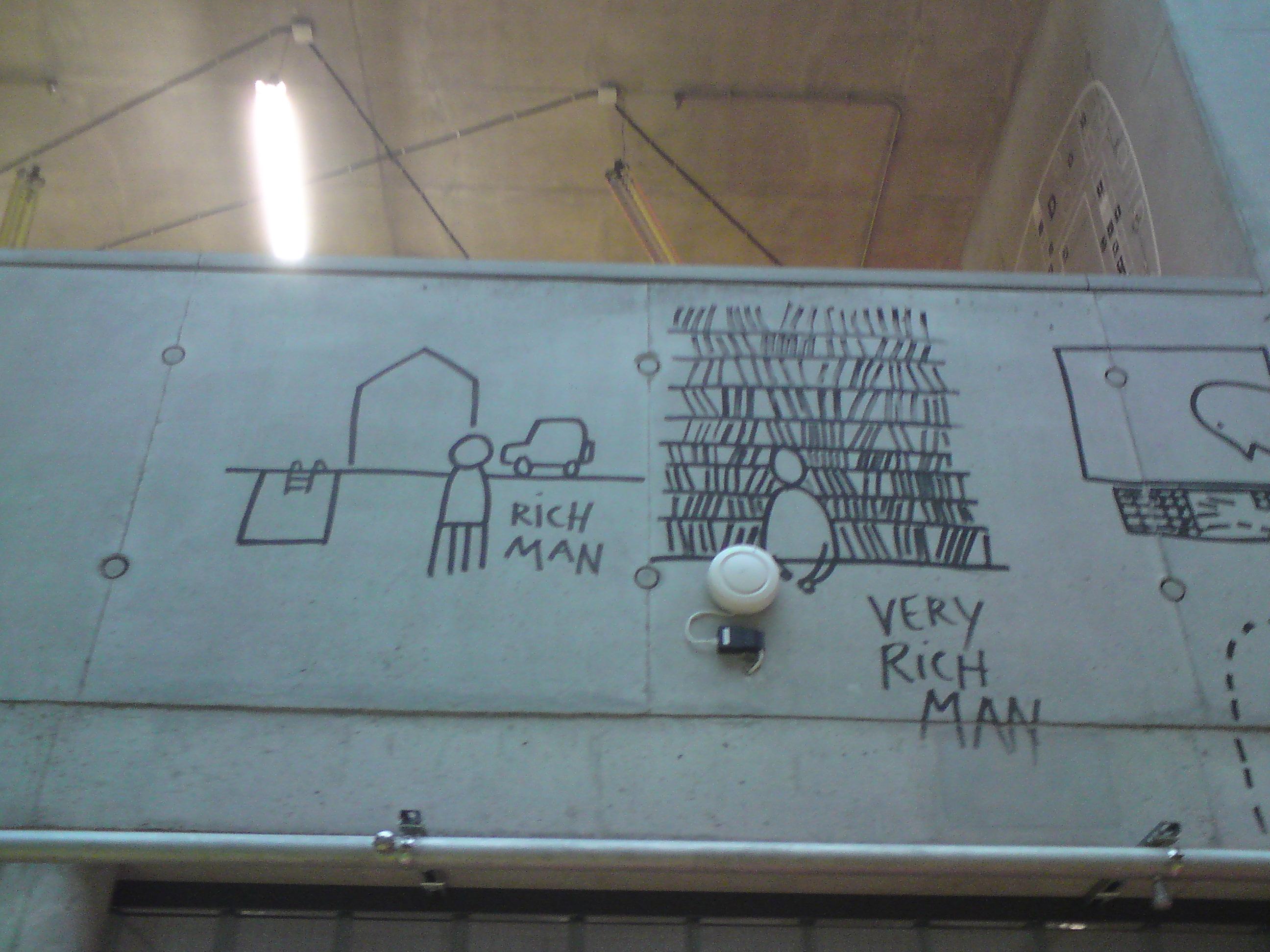
Graphic design follows the "technical schoolbook" concept.

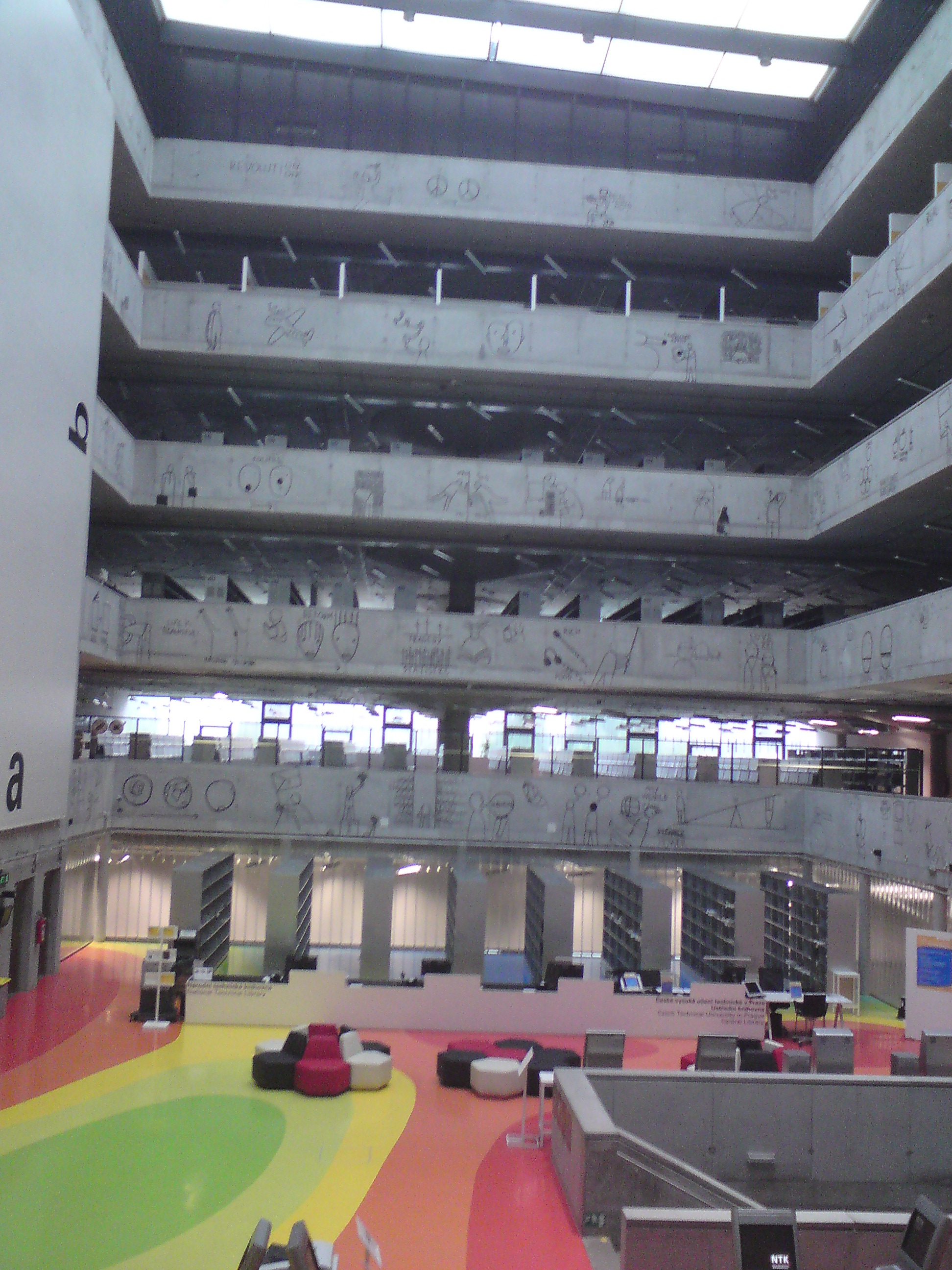
Bold-coloured flooring and movable furniture is designed to give an openness and friendliness to the space.

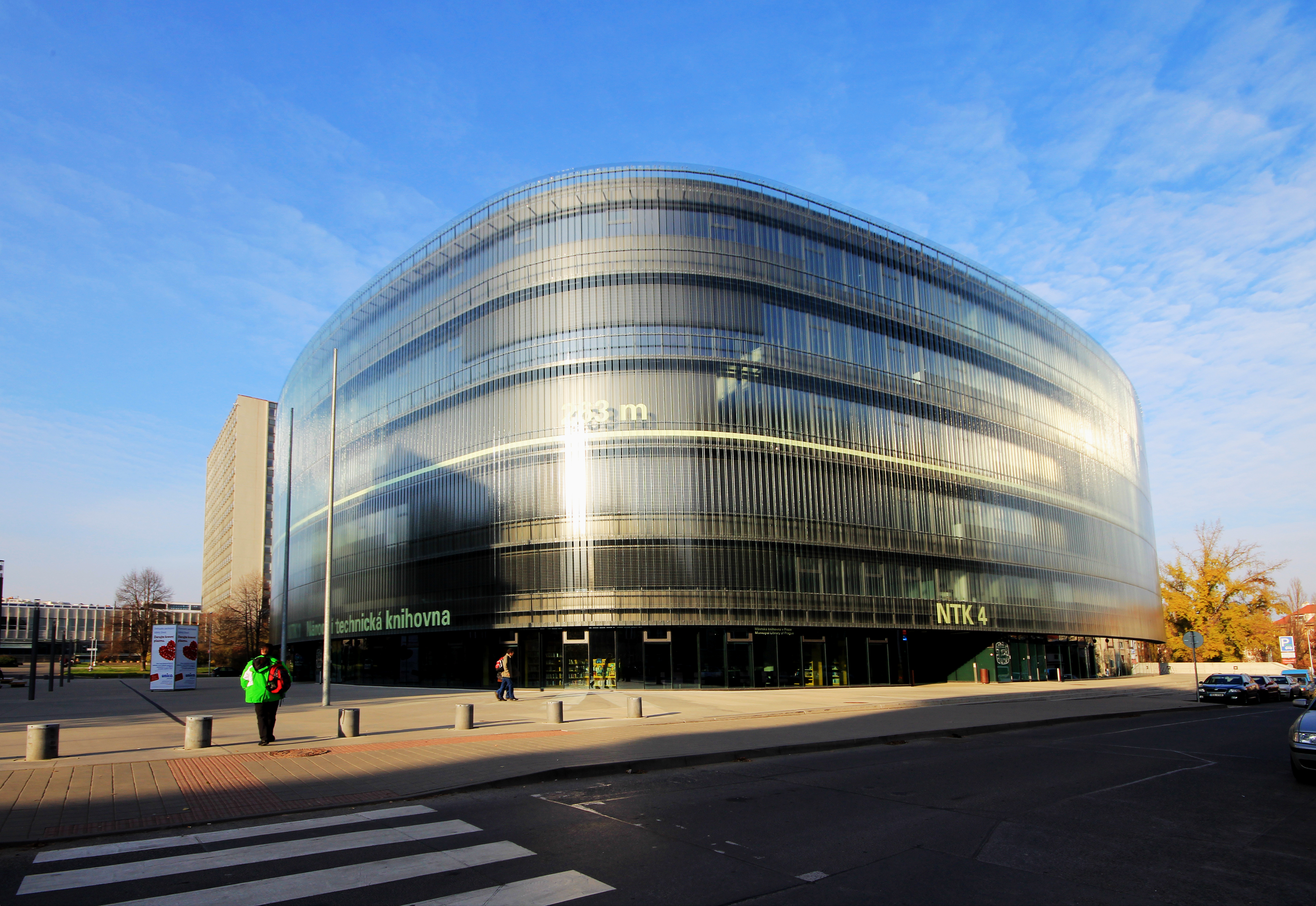
National Library of Technology in Prague (NTK) - year 2012.

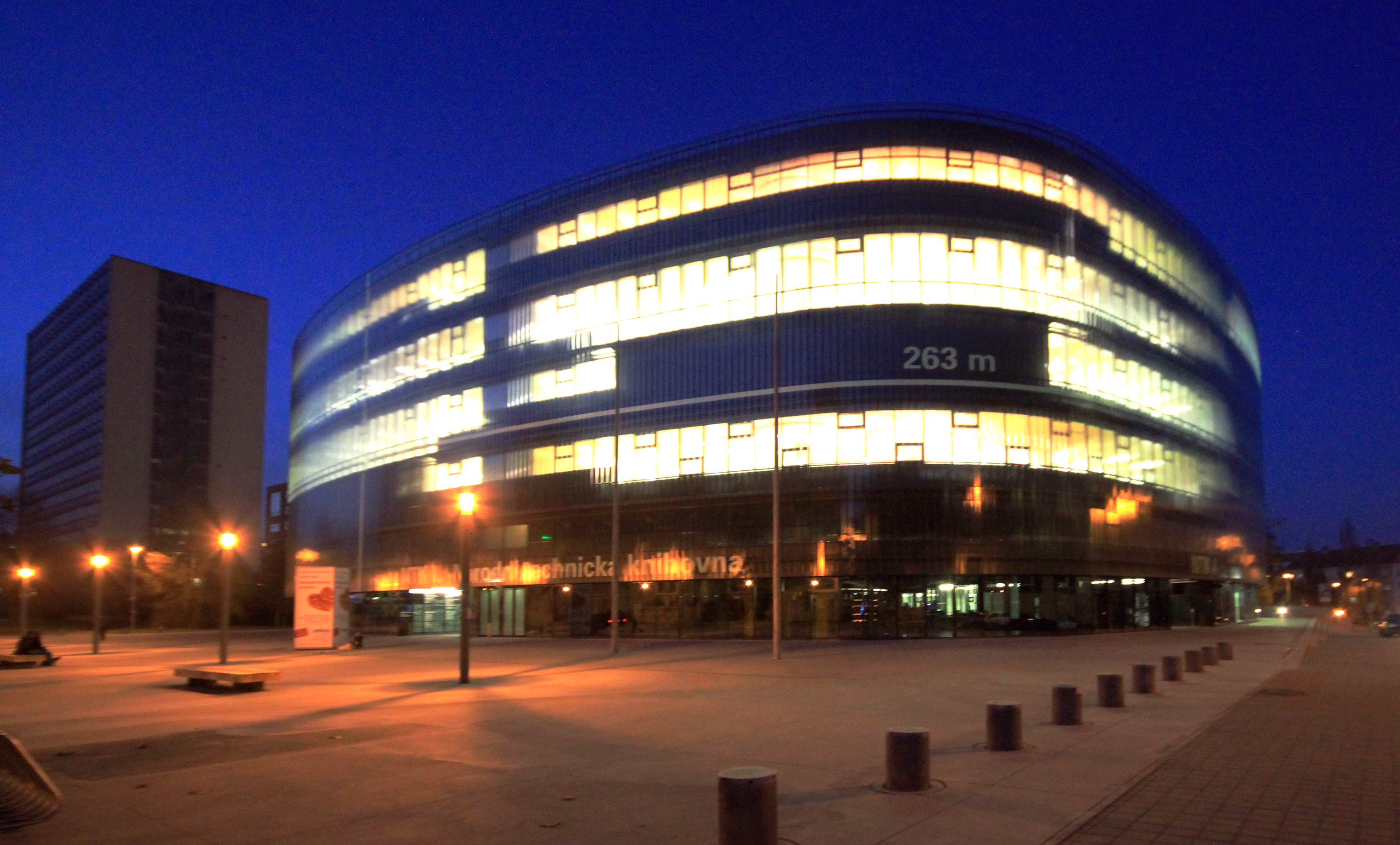
National Library of Technology in Prague (NTK) - year 2012.

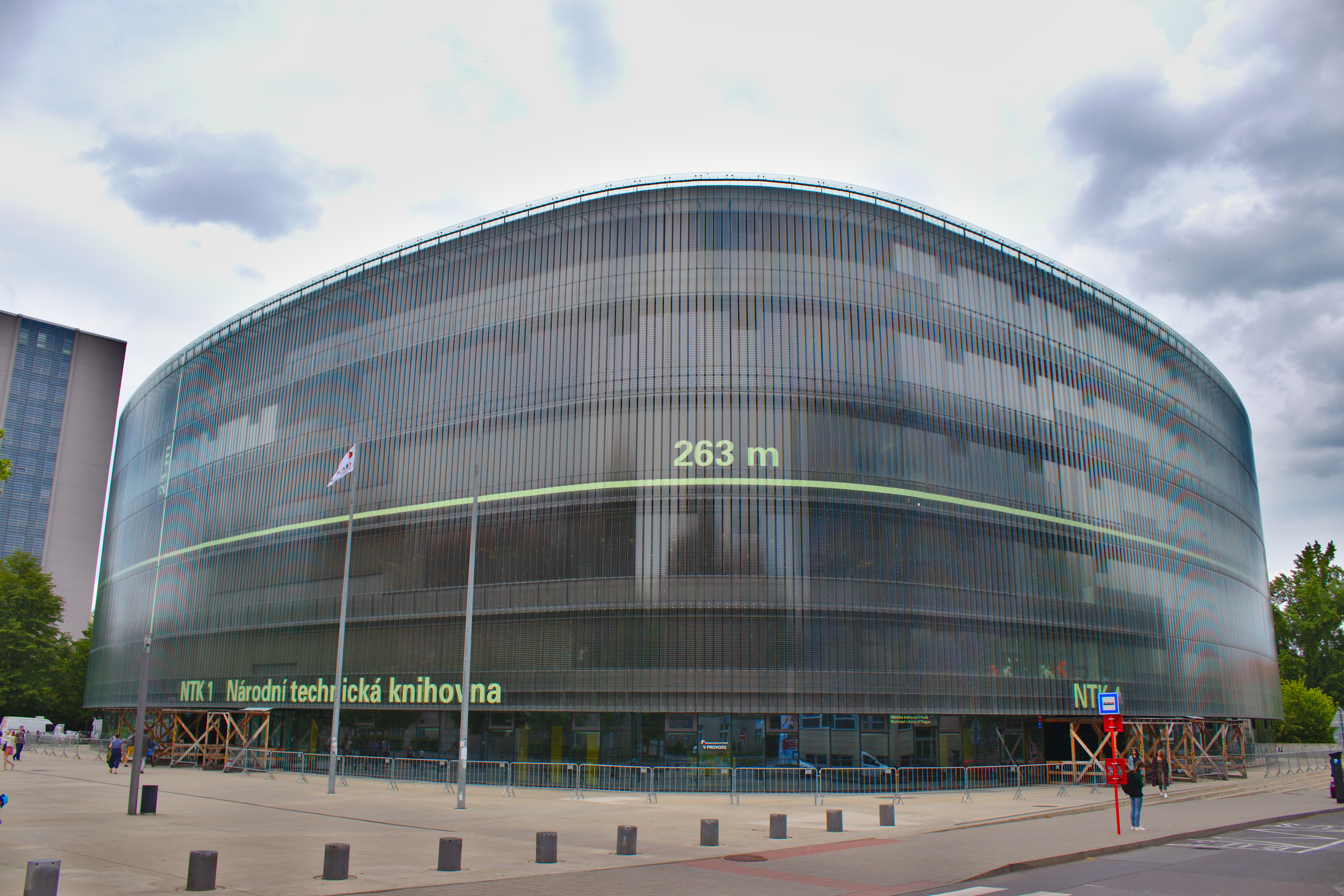
The library in 2019

== See also ==
- List of libraries in the Czech Republic
