= Municipal Library of Prague =

Czech library

Municipal Library of Prague Městská knihovna v Praze
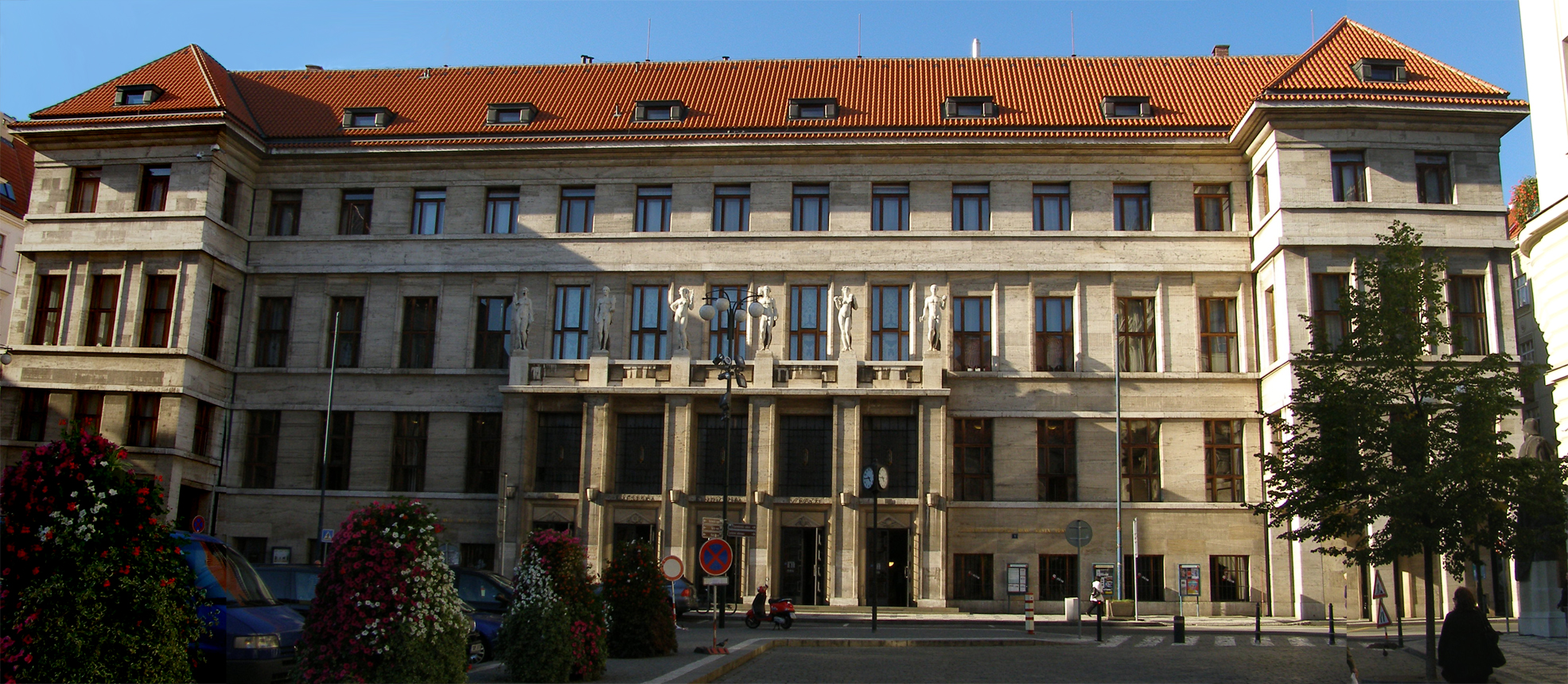
- Main building of the library in the Old Town of Prague (so-called Central Library)
- 50°5′14.57″N 14°25′2.57″E
- Location: Prague, Czech Republic
- Type: Public library
- Established: 1891
- Branches: 40

Collection
- Items collected: Books, magazines, maps, electronic media
- Size: 2,071,323 items

Access and use
- Population served: General public
- Members: 180,508

Other information
- Employees: 480
- Website: http://www.mlp.cz/en/

The Municipal Library of Prague (Czech: Městská knihovna v Praze) is one of the largest libraries in Prague, Czech Republic. It is an open institution that offers access to fiction and educational literature for children and adults. Its collection includes CDs with music and spoken word, DVDs with Czech and foreign films, maps, sheet music, MP3s, newspapers and magazines, prints and reproductions. It provides its readers with free access to international information databases, as well as allowing the public to use the Internet on a PC or free wi-fi connection. The service to the public is world-class. In addition to information and research services, the library organises public events, concerts, theatre and dance performances, talks with authors, fashion shows, discussions. It is one of the most important libraries in the country.

The oldest item in the library's collections is a print of the Prague Bible from 1488.

== History ==
The first public municipal library in Prague started its activity on 1 July 1891. At the beginning it had 3 370 books, which were used in the lending and reading rooms. In 1903 it found its permanent location on the corner of Platnéřská Street, Žatecká Street and Mariánské náměstí in the Old Town, i.e. in the place where its present Central Building stands. In 1898–1920, the director was the librarian and well-known poet Antonín Sova, who began to build a system of catalogues, established the first six branches and tried to push for the library to get "a dignified building in the centre of the city".

On 1 January 1922, a law uniting Prague and 38 other towns and municipalities came into force. At the same time, a proposal was approved to merge the libraries of these municipalities and to create a single Library of the Capital City of Prague. The library network consisted of the Central Library and 40 other libraries in the city. The collection had about 260 thousand volumes and almost 700 thousand loans were made annually. Signatures and catalogues were unified and book purchases were centralised. Other libraries were also established, and in 1938 there were libraries in 50 locations in Prague (library fund of 640 thousand volumes, number of borrowings about 2 million). Dr. Jan Thon played an important role in the development of the library and was its director in 1920-1942 and 1945–1948.

During the Nazi occupation, thousands of books, racially, politically and ideologically objectionable from the Nazi point of view, were discarded and several library workers were imprisoned. The year 1945 marked the resumption of normal activities and the return of the discarded books, but after February 1948 there was a total ideologization of all library activities and considerable organizational chaos. There was a scrapping and liquidation of part of the collection and also a personnel action against a number of qualified workers.

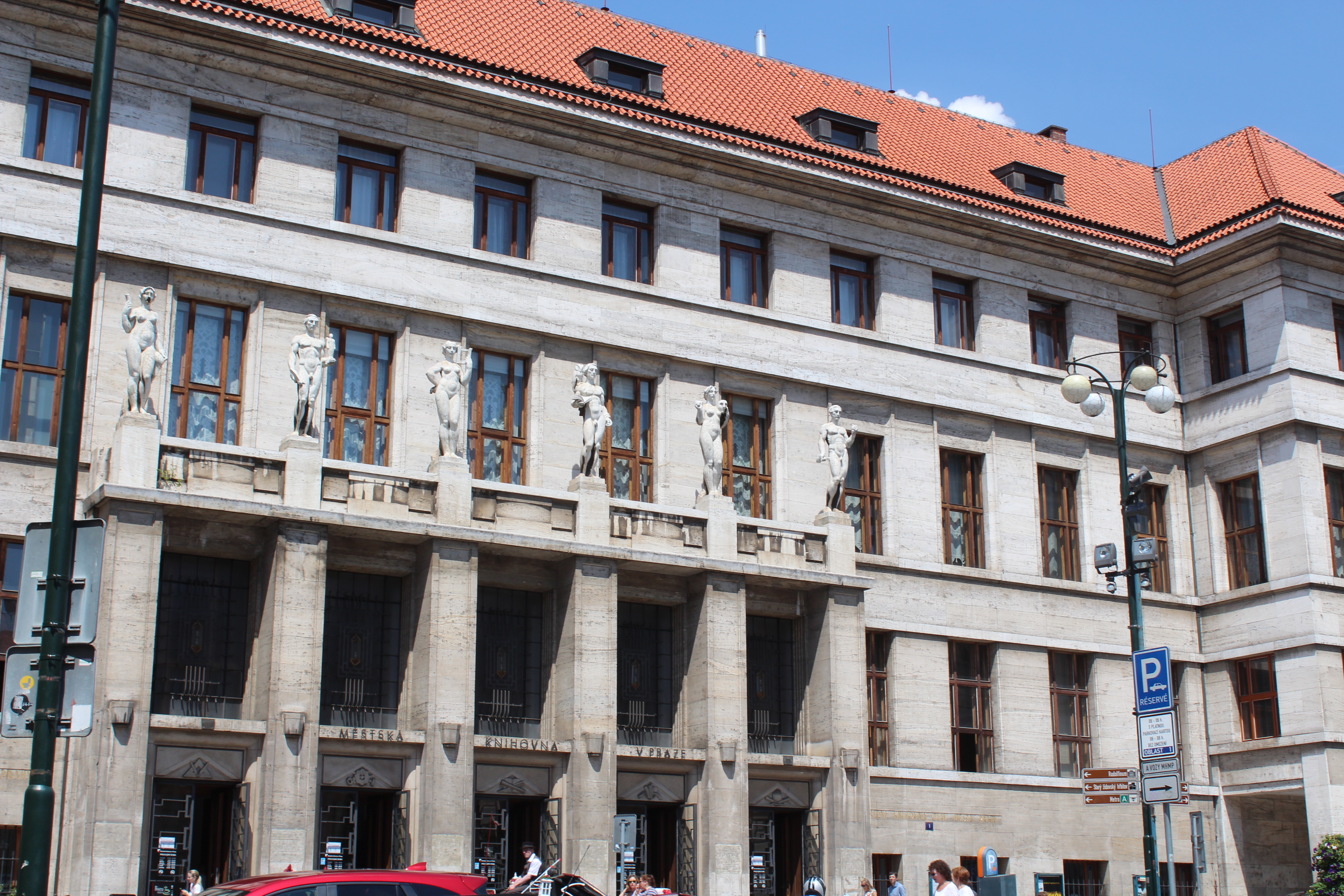
Six allegories by Ladislav Kofranek above the main entrance

Interior of the Main Building of the Municipal Library Prague

In the second half of the 1950s, the professional level of the library was gradually restored, and the 1960s brought the development of library services. In 1966, the library became a co-organiser of the Prague Symposium on Large City Libraries and one of the initiators of INTAMEL (International Association of Large City Libraries). In 1968, the library joined the demands of the so-called Prague Spring with its action programme. Twelve new branches were opened and other specialised departments were established (e.g. a study room for pragensia). The "People's University of Science, Technology and Art" became part of the library, engaged in educational and cultural activities, which gained the library considerable popularity in the relatively favourable climate of the time.

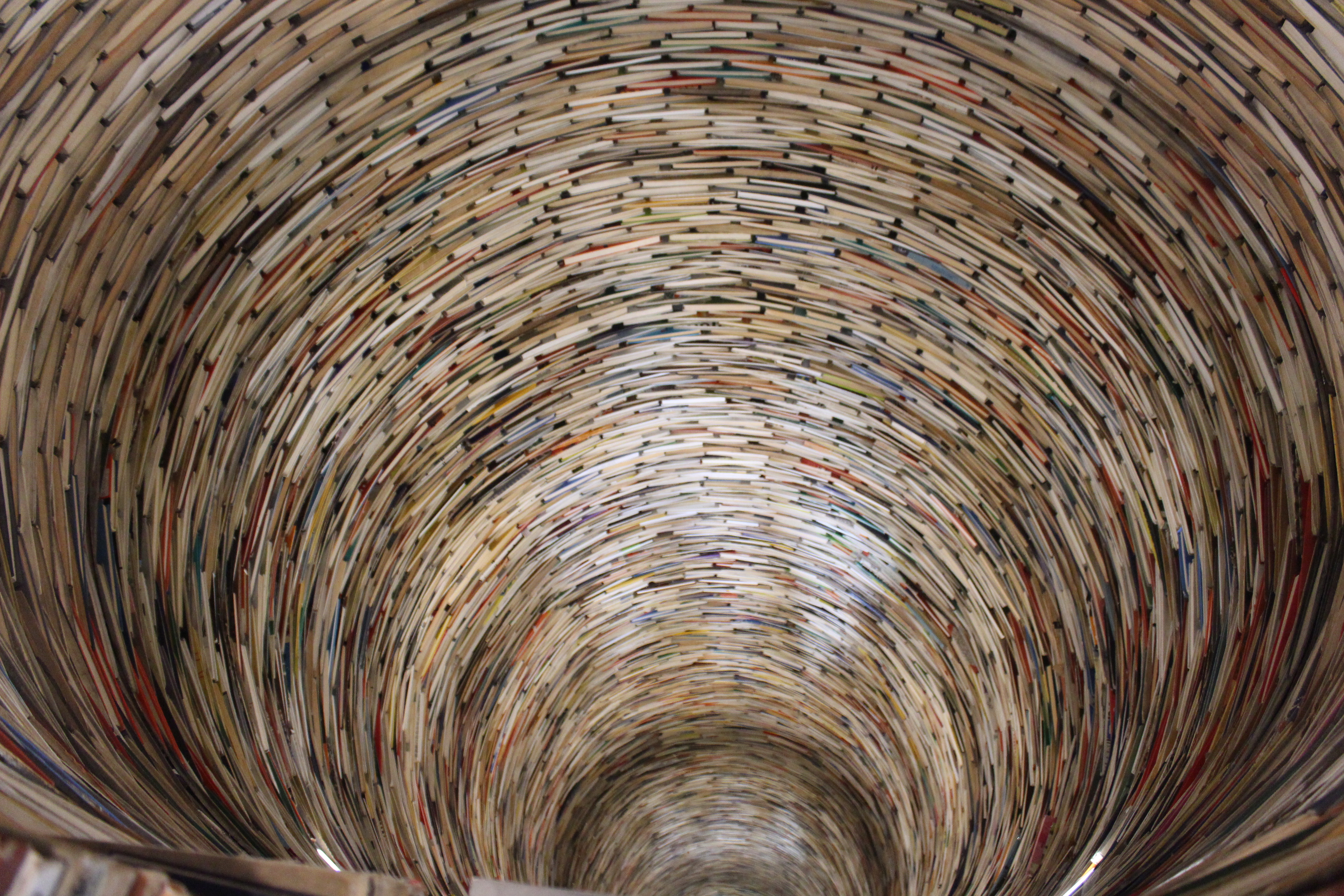
Idiom (known as the book tower)

The so-called "normalisation" of the 1970s brought again strong ideological pressure, the creation of new "libri prohibiti", a complete freeze of international cooperation and a general stagnation of the library. Since the end of the 1970s, the library's internal work has been gradually renewed. The revolution in 1989 marked the return to the standard status of the library in a democratic society.

In 2015, the library operated 40 branches and three library buses. The largest library in the network is the Central Library on Mariánské náměstí. The director of the library is Tomáš Řehák.

It is currently one of the most important and also most generously funded libraries in the Czech Republic. The library is of national importance also because it provides data on individual books to other libraries in the Czech Republic and thus has an impact on the functioning of the Czech library network.

=== Library directors and administrators ===
1910–1920	Antonín Sova (1864–1928)
1920–1942	PhDr. Jan Thon (1886–1973)
1942–V/1945	Dr. Jan Grmela (1895–1957)
V/1945–XI/1948	PhDr. Jan Thon (since February 1948 in parallel with the administrator)
II/1948–VI/1949	Jaroslav Frey (1902–1983), in charge of the library
VI/1949–IV/1950	PhDr. Jaroslav Kunc (1912–1983)
X/1951–II/1954	Josef Šmídt
II/1954–II/1957	Josef Hušek (1912–1981)
III/1957–X/1970	PhDr. Rudolf Málek (1919–2001)
XI/1970–IX/1978	RNDr. Vladana Čeledová (* 1919)
X/1978–VI/2002	Mgr. Anna Bimková (* 1941)
VII/2002–today	RNDr. Tomáš Řehák (* 1964)

== Central Library ==
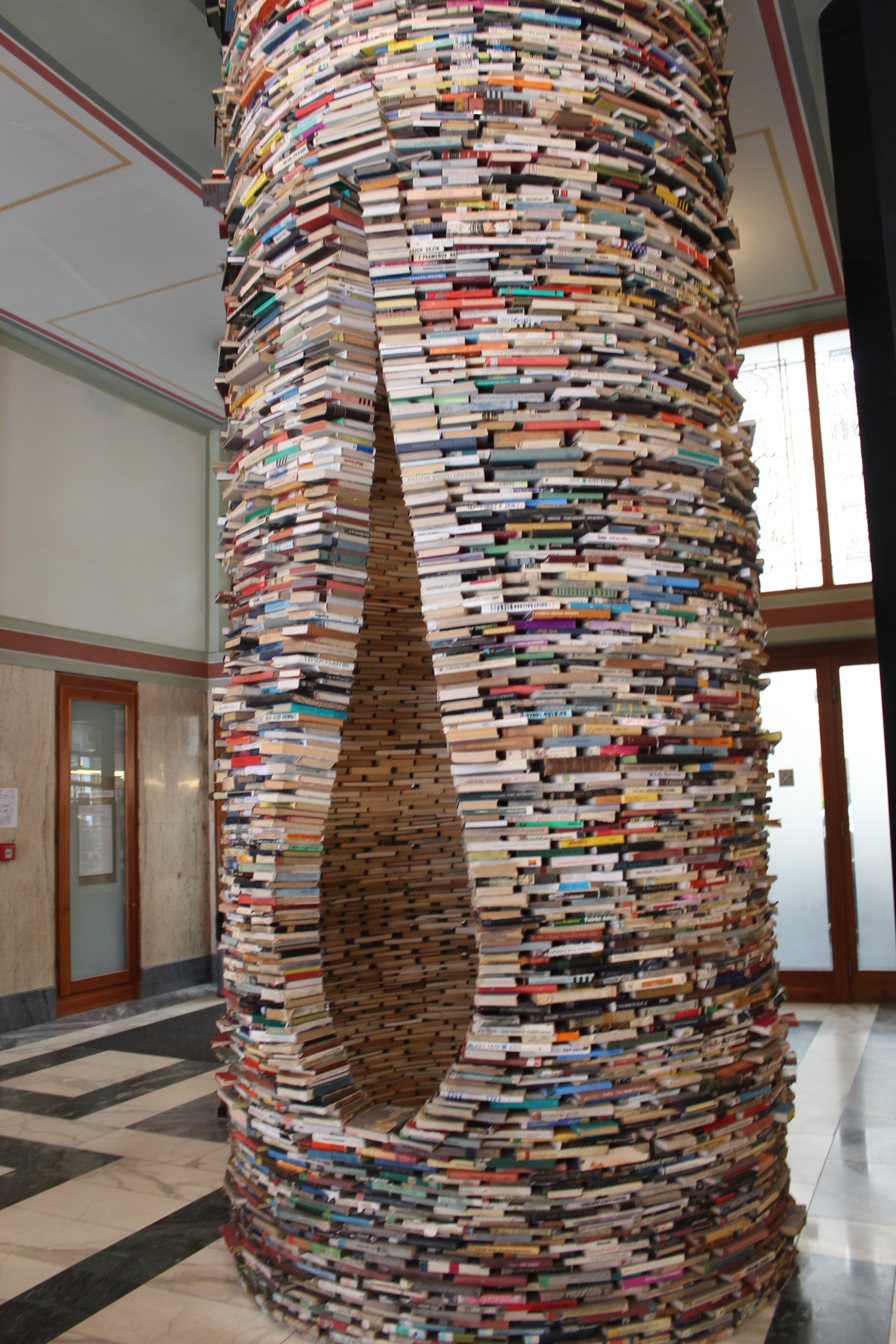
The Idiom

The Central Library is located in the house No. 98/I on Mariánské náměstí in the Old Town, with side facades at 2 Valentinská Street and 1 Žatecká Street. It was the first purpose-built library building in Czechoslovakia and one of the most modern in Europe. It was designed for a wide range of activities, not only for libraries, but also for concerts, education and exhibitions. The extensive and modern storage facilities allowed for the dynamic growth of the library collection. The building was constructed by the companies of Václav Nekvasil and the Kavalír brothers. Partial reconstructions were carried out in 1936-1937 and 1939 (architect Jan Sokol for the collection of old art), 1958, 1963 (modification of the auditorium of the large hall) and 1988-1989 (Bohumil Fantaː roofing of the courtyard). The last reconstruction took place in 1996-1997 and the restorers tried to bring the building back to the state in which it welcomed its first readers seventy years ago.

Since 1998, the foyer of the building has housed the so-called Idiom (also known as the book tower), a column of 8,000 books by the Slovak artist Matej Kren.

The main entrance is covered by a five-axis portico. In its windows are decorative grilles designed by Karel Štipl, and above them small tympanums with five sculptures symbolizing the branches of human labour. On the portico there are six sculptures of allegories of art by sculptor Ladislav Kofranek on the first floor balcony. The sculptures represent in turn literature, sculpture, music, philosophy, drama and architecture. The façade area is clad in Gorizia sandstone and divided by simple cornices. The tympanum above the left side entrance in the arcade, leading to the residence of the Mayor of Prague, has a sculptural decoration with the emblems of the city of Prague.

== See also ==
- List of libraries in the Czech Republic
