= Jonáš Záborský =

Slovak lower nobleman and writer

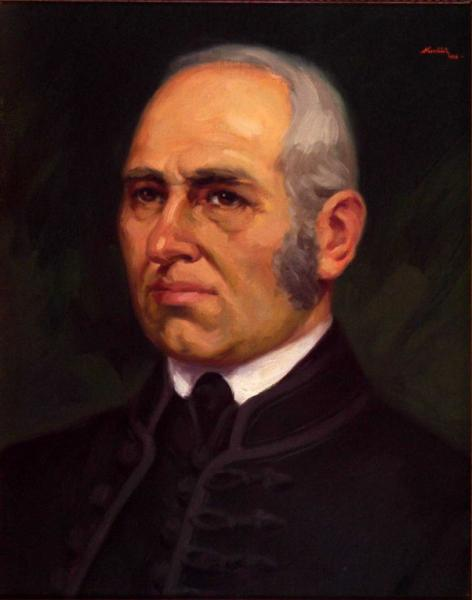
- Jonáš Záborský
- Born: February 3, 1812; Záborie, Kingdom of Hungary
- Died: January 23, 1876 (aged 63); Župčany, Austria-Hungary
- Resting place: Župčany, Slovakia
- Occupations: poet, writer, priest

Jonáš Záborský (February 3, 1812 in Záborie, Kingdom of Hungary – January 23, 1876 in Župčany) was a Slovak lower nobleman and writer. He was an author of tales, epigrams, allegorical-philosophical poems, satirical poems, historical dramas, comedies and stories.

His notable works include:

- Vstúpenie Krista do Raja (1866)
- Lžedimitrijady (1866)
- Faustiáda (1866)
- Najdúch (1870)
- Dva dni v Chujave (1873)

== Works online ==
- Dejiny Veľkej Moravy a počiatky Uhorska. Turč. sv. Martin : Matica slovenská, 1929. 16 s. - available at ULB Digital Library
- Svätoplukova zrada. Praha: L. Mazáč, 1935. 236 s. - available at ULB Digital Library

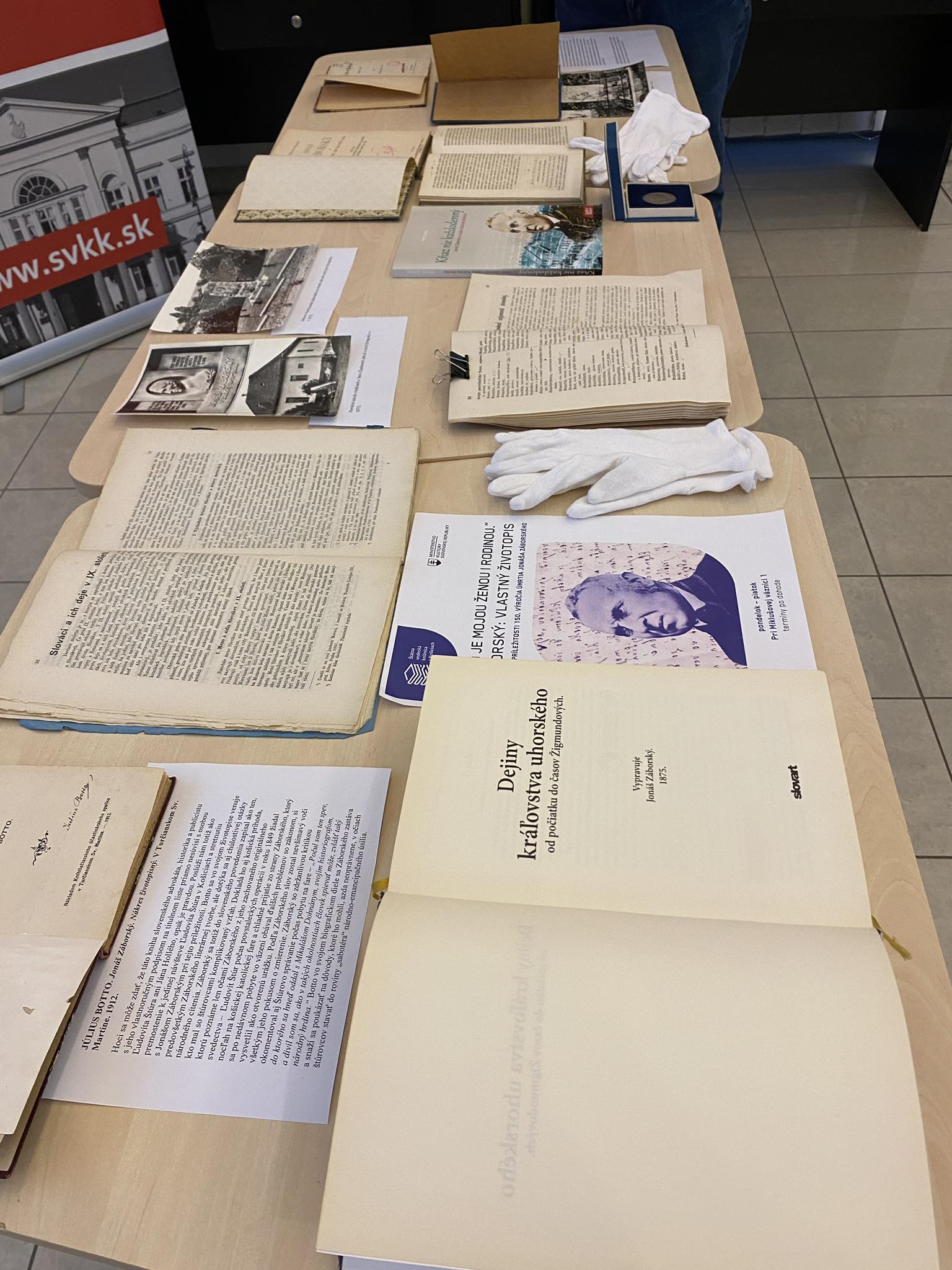
Exhibition of books by Jonáš Záborský at Slovak Matica event in Košice

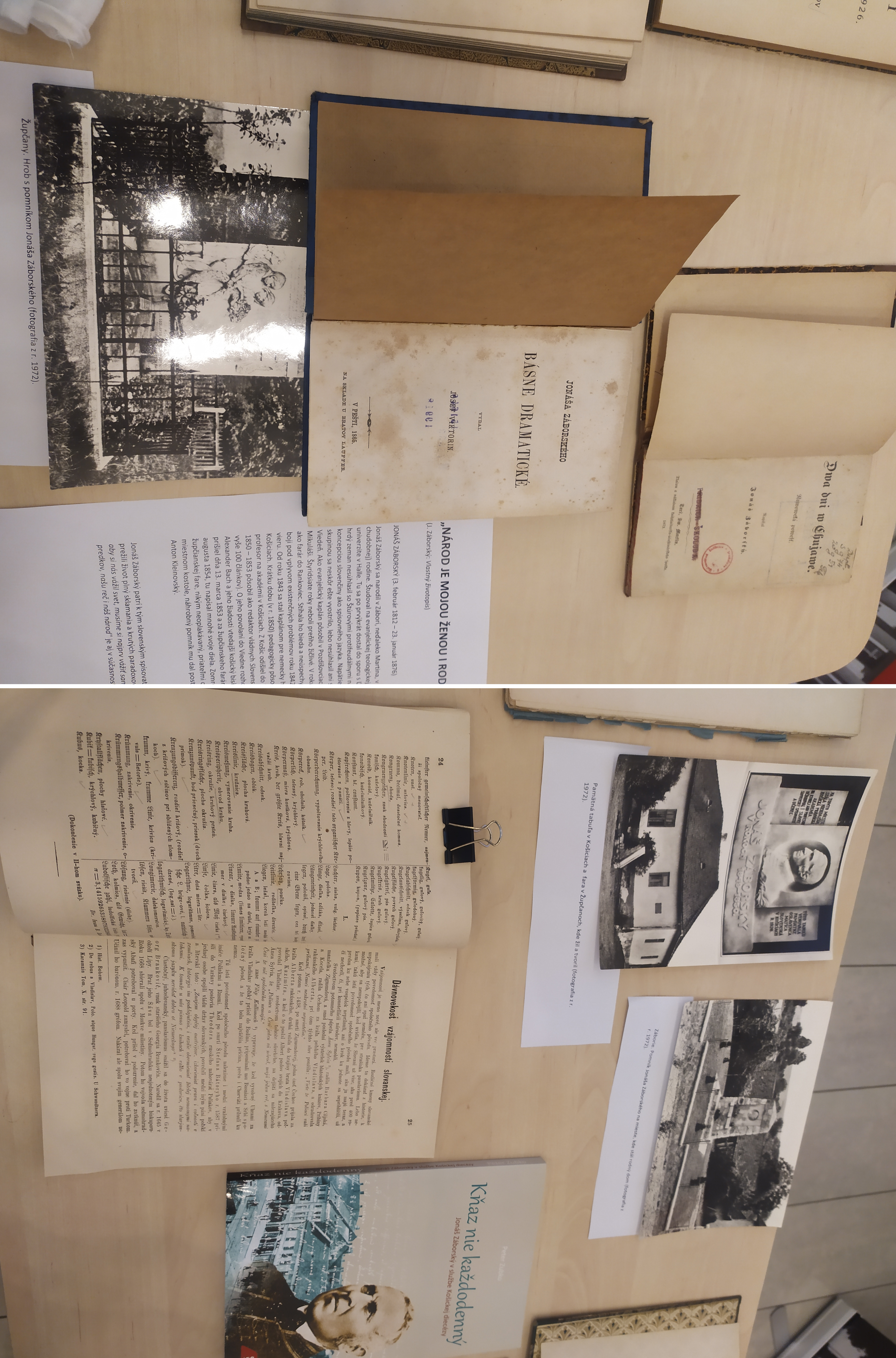
Works by Jonáš Záborský at event of Slovak Matica
