= Arneth =

Arneth is a surname. Notable people with the surname include:

- Joseph Calasanza, Ritter von Arneth (1791–1863), Austrian numismatist and archæologist
- Alfred Ritter von Arneth (1819–1897), Austrian historian, son of Joseph
- Josef Arneth (1873–1955), German physician and haematologist known for naming the Arneth count
