= Alfred von Arneth =

Austrian historian

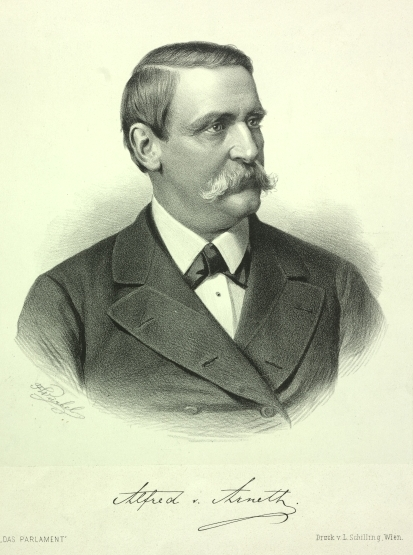
Alfred von Arneth

Alfred Ritter von Arneth (10 July 1819 – 30 July 1897) was an Austrian historian. His principal scholarly work is a ten-volume biography of the Habsburg Empress Maria Theresa, first published in installments from 1863 to 1879 and still regarded as the standard work on the subject. Born at Vienna, he was the son of Joseph Calasanza von Arneth (1791–1863), a well-known historian and archaeologist, who wrote a history of the Austrian Empire (Vienna, 1827) and several works on numismatics and brother of Doctor Franz Hektor von Arneth (1818–1907).

== Life ==
Alfred Arneth studied law, and became an official of the Austrian state archives, of which in 1868 he was appointed keeper. He was a moderate liberal in politics and a supporter of German unity. As such he was elected to the Frankfurt parliament in 1848. In 1861 he became a member of the Lower Austrian diet and in 1869 was nominated to the Upper House of the Austrian Reichsrat. In 1879 he was appointed president of the Kaiserliche Academie der Wissenschaften (Academy of Sciences) at Vienna, and in 1896 succeeded von Sybel as chairman of the historical commission at Munich.

Von Arneth was an indefatigable worker, and, as director of the archives, his willingness to listen to the advice of experts, as well as his own sound sense, reportedly helped to promote the more scientific treatment and use of public records in most of the archives of Europe. He was noted for his scientific temper and for drawing from original sources.

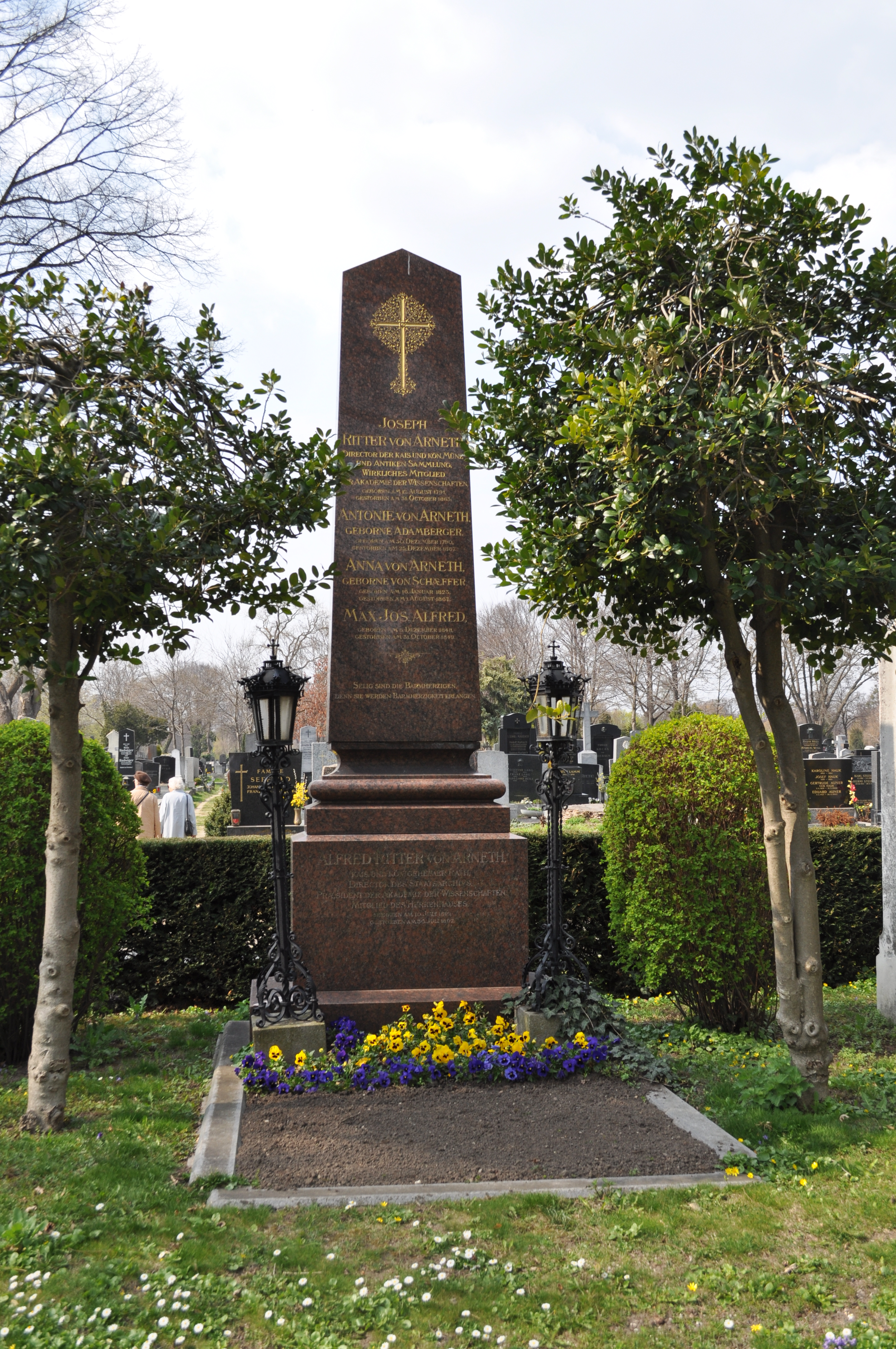
Gravesite at the Hauptfriedhof in Vienna

== Publications ==
- Leben des Feldmarschalls Grafen Guido Starhemberg (Vienna, 1863)
- Prinz Eugen von Savoyen (3 vols, ib. 1864)
- Geschichte Maria Theresias (10 vols, ib. 1863–1879)
- Maria Theresa u. Marie Antoinette, ihr Briefwechsel (ib. 1866)
- Marie Antoinette, Joseph II. and Leopold II., ihr Briefwechsel (1866)
- Maria Theresa and Joseph II., ihre Korrespondenz samt Briefen Josephs an seinen Bruder Leopold (3 vols, 1867)
- Beaumarchais and Sonnenfels (1868)
- Joseph II. and Katharina von Russland, ihr Briefwechsel (1869)
- Johann Christian Barthenstein and seine Zeit (1871)
- Joseph II. und Leopold von Toskana, ihr Briefwechsel (2 vols, 1872)
- Briefe der Kaiserin Maria Theresa an ihre Kinder and Freunde (4 vols, 1881)
- Marie Antoinette: Correspondance secrète entre Marie-Thérése et le comte de Mercy-Argenteau (3 vols, Paris, 1875), in collaboration with Auguste Geoffroy
- Graf Philipp Cobenzl and seine Memoiren (1885)
- Correspondance secrète du comte de Mercy-Argenteau avec l'empereur Joseph IL et Kaunitz (2 vols, 1889–1891), in collaboration with Jules Flammermont
- Anton Ritter von Schmerling. Episoden aus seinem Leben 1835, 1848–1849 (1895)
- Johann Freiherr von Wessenberg, ein österreichischer Staatsmann des 19. Jahrh. (2 vols, 1898).

Arneth also published in 1893 two volumes of early reminiscences under the title Aus meinem Leben.

== His works online ==
- Arneth, A. / Maria Theresia und der Hofrath von Greiner. 1859. In: Die vorgebliche Tochter der Kaiserin Elisabeth Petrowna : nach den Akten des Kaiserlich Russischen Reichsarchiv's. Berlin: Carl Duncker, 1867. 70 p. – available at University Library in Bratislava Digital Library
- Arneth, Alfred / Maria Theresia: I. Wien: Jacob & Holzhausen, 1863. 425 p. – available at University Library in Bratislava Digital Library
- Arneth, Alfred / Maria Theresia und Marie Antoinette: ihr Briefwechsel während der Jahre 1770–1780. Wien: Wilhelm Braumüller, 1865. 373 p. – available at University Library in Bratislava Digital Library
- Arneth, Alfred / Briefe der Kaiserin Maria Theresia an ihre Kinder und Freunde: Band 1. Wien: Wilhelm Braumüller, 1881. 438 p. – available at University Library in Bratislava Digital Library
- Arneth, Alfred / Briefe der Kaiserin Maria Theresia an ihre Kinder und Freunde : Band 2. Wien: Wilhelm Braumüller, 1881. 524 p. – available at University Library in Bratislava Digital Library
- Arneth, Alfred / Briefe der Kaiserin Maria Theresia an ihre Kinder und Freunde : Band 3. Wien: Wilhelm Braumüller, 1881. 490 p. – available at University Library in Bratislava Digital Library
- Arneth, Alfred / Briefe der Kaiserin Maria Theresia an ihre Kinder und Freunde : Band 4. Wien: Wilhelm Braumüller, 1881. 631 p. – available at University Library in Bratislava Digital Library
- Arneth, Alfred / Maria Theresia und Joseph II. : ihre Correspondenz sammt Briefen Joseph's an seinen Bruder Leopold : 1. Band : 1761–1772. Wien: Carl Gerold's Sohn, 1867. 418 p. – available at University Library in Bratislava Digital Library
- Arneth, Alfred / Maria Theresia und Joseph II. : ihre Correspondenz sammt Briefen Joseph's an seinen Bruder Leopold : 2. Band : 1773 – Juli 1778. Wien: Carl Gerold's Sohn, 1867. 410 p. – available at University Library in Bratislava Digital Library
- Arneth, Alfred / Maria Theresia und Joseph II. : ihre Correspondenz sammt Briefen Joseph's an seinen Bruder Leopold : 3. Band : August 1778–1780. Wien: Carl Gerold's Sohn, 1868. 411 p. – available at University Library in Bratislava Digital Library
- Fromageot / Jahrbücher der Regierung Marien Theresiens, verwittibten Kaiserinn, Königinn zu Ungarn und Böhmen, Erzherzoginn zu Oesterreich, u. u. : aus dem Französischen ... – Wien: Leipzig: Joseph Kurzböck, 1776. 374 p. – available at University Library in Bratislava Digital Library
- Das goldene Jahrhundert oder Maria Theresia und Friedrich. Augsburg: bey Albert Friedrich Bartholomäi, 1779. 190 p. – available at University Library in Bratislava Digital Library
- Mariae II. Ungariae regis quadragesimi octavi Decretum Tertium. Posonii: [s.n.], 1764. 12 p. – available at University Library in Bratislava Digital Library
- Mária Terézia / Constitutio criminalis Theresiana : aneb Ržímské Cýsařske w Uhřich a w Cžechách etc. etc. Králowské Aposstolské Milosti Marye Terezye Arcý-Kněžny Rakauské, etc. etc, hrdelní Práwní Ržád. W Wídni : Wytisstěný u Jána Tomásse urozeného z Trattnern, 1769. 374 p. – available at University Library in Bratislava Digital Library
- de BROGLIE, Albert le duc / Marie-Thérese impératrice : 1744–1746 : 1. Paris: Calmann Lévy, 1890. 466 p. – available at University Library in Bratislava Digital Library
- Transaction mit dem Erz-Stift Salzburg : Güttenbergische Berg-Gerichts Jurisdiction; Maria Theresia, Erz-Herzogin zu Österreich; Index alphabeticus; Mariae Theresiae, Erz-Herzogin zu Österreich; Index Alphabeticus; Index Alphabeticus; Mariae Theresia, ... Wien: Leopold Johann Kalivoda, 1759. 289 p. – available at University Library in Bratislava Digital Library

== Sources ==
- Genealogisches Taschenbuch der Adeligen Häuser Österreichs, Volume 1 (1905 Wien) p. 51.
