= University Library, Bratislava =

State library in Slovakia

The University Library in Bratislava
- Univerzitná knižnica v Bratislave
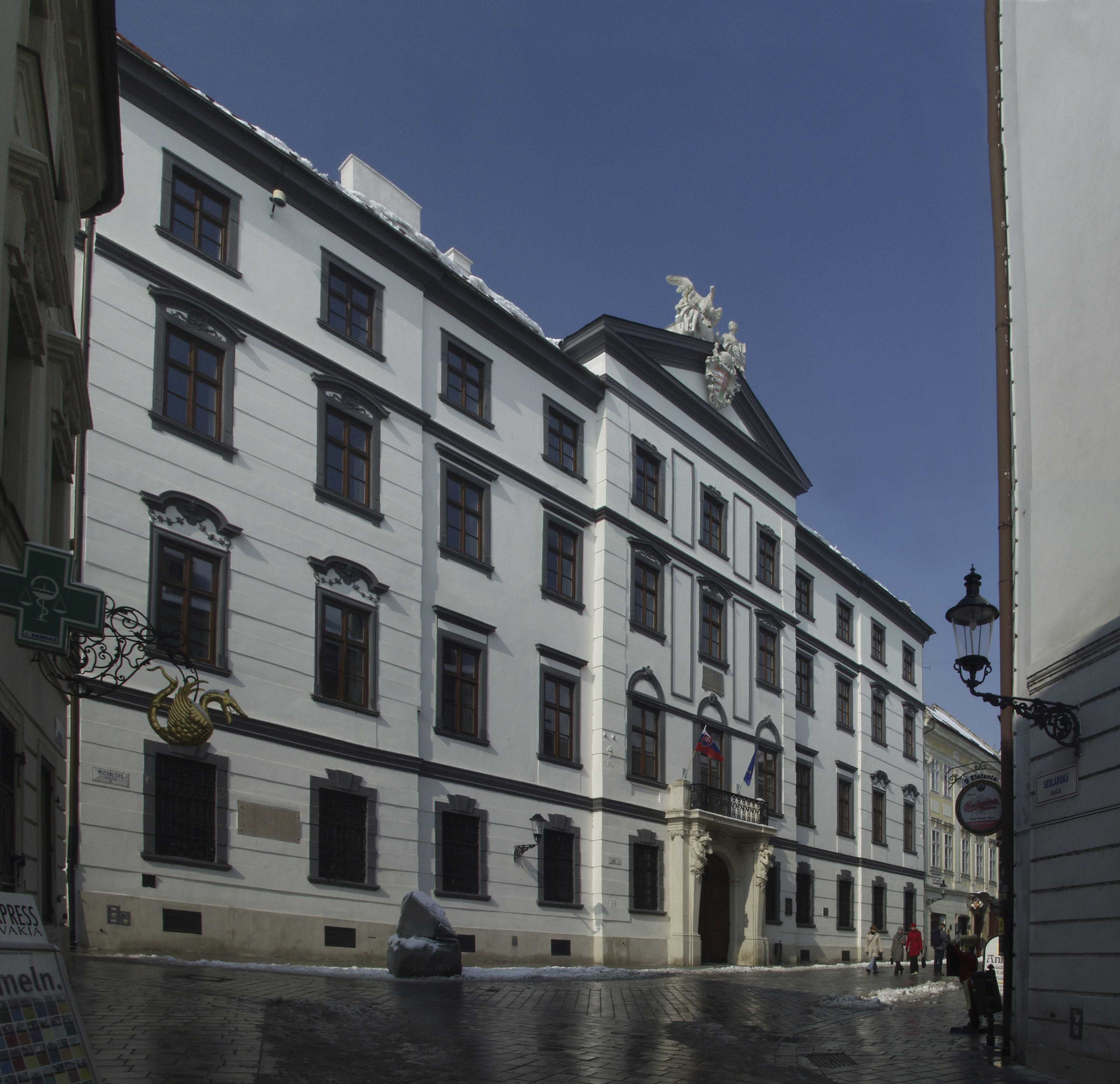
- View of the Library from the street in Bratislava's historical centre. One of three library buildings.
- 48.14358768716351°N 17.10726090520872°E
- Location: Bratislava, Slovakia
- Type: Academic library
- Established: 1919

Other information
- Website: https://www.ulib.sk/sk/otvaracie-hodiny/

University Library in Bratislava (Univerzitná knižnica v Bratislave) is the oldest library in Slovakia. It was founded in 1919 in Bratislava. Today, it is the largest and most visited library in Slovakia and it is a universal state research library.

== History ==
The library was one of the first cultural and educational institutions set up in the newly founded Czecho-Slovak Republic after WWI at the territory of Slovakia to support the emerging university education, science and library system. Its origin in 1919 was closely connected with the newly founded Comenius Czechoslovak State University where the name of the university was reflected in the Library's name. The library has never become an integral part of university, although relations between the two institutions were based on collaboration and close contact. The Library keeps its name because it refers to the original close contact towards the university and at the same time reflects the universal character of its collections.

As the time passed by the authorities set further goals and competences for ULB within the national and international framework. ULB has become the first library entitled to the legal deposit from the territory of Slovakia, and it is the only one which has kept this tradition since 1919 until today. Library's historical book collections also have the character of a depository collection. Until 1954 ULB fulfilled the tasks of the national library in Slovakia. Since then it has the statute of a universal state research library.

Throughout its history two clear directions can be identified : a solid leading place in the national library system and active participation in international library cooperation.

== Reconstruction of the historical buildings of the Library ==
The main objective was to renew buildings which are protected as cultural monuments, to modernize decaying library premises, to solve the lack of stacks and eliminated the danger of stagnation in the field of library services. Realization of the investment project "Multifunctional Cultural and Library Centre" led to a vast renewal and revitalization, it allowed the library users to utilize not only the refurbished premises, which they had already known, but also those parts of the historical buildings, which until that time the public did not have access to. New library stacks have been built, number of working stations has increased. Conditions for the protection of historical library collections significantly improved, including so called Bašagić Collection af Arabic, Turkish and Persian manuscripts inscribed on the UNESCO world heritage list "Memory of the World". The traditional library has transformed to a mediatheque and a portal to the virtual world of information. The profile of the Library was enlarged to fulfill multifunctional cultural and social functions. The project of the reconstruction resulted in a synthesis of old and new : a modern library equipped with technologies of 21st century in a restored, originally baroque interior, supplemented by new exhibition, concert, conference and social premises.

== Library as a geographic point ==
Since its beginning in 1919 the Library has its seat downtown Bratislava, in the heart of the historical centre of the Slovak capital. In comparison with other libraries in the town or in some Slovak regional towns, this unique location means advantage - Bratislava is and will be the political, economic, educational, scientific, cultural and social centre of the country. Paradoxically - to point out several facts imposing limitations on its further development - one of the most limiting factors is the seat of the Library in a most attractive city location as well as the historical character of its main buildings. Both aspects practically exclude further expansion in space, better transport access, prevent further enhancement of infrastructure and services.

== Present days ==
At present ULB is by all means a consolidated institution with a highly developed infrastructure and relevant professional and human potential. The Library as a multifunctional cultural and library centre visited by approx. 300 thousand visitors and virtually via internet it is sought for assistance by further 700 thousand users a year.

== Cooperation with other libraries ==
Cooperation with other libraries on a national and international scale was a natural part of the ULB's mission from its very beginning.

- since 1970 ULB is an individual member of the IFLA Federation,
- since 1997 an associated member of the CERL consortium,
- since 1990 a member of the LIBER
- in 1950 the UN depository library was opened at ULB,
- in 1957 UNESCO depository library and since 1994 a national UNESCO Centre is an integral part of the Library. It works closely with UNESCO libraries worldwide, schools associated with UNESCO and also secures activities of the National Committee for the UNESCO programme Memory of the World. In 1997 ULB acceded to the UNESCO ISSN project of identifying serials and other continuing resources and established ISSN National Agency for Slovakia on its premises.
- in 2004 following the country's accession to EU and NATO, ULB opened NATO Depository Library.
- in 1997 Centre for American Studies started to work at the Library owing to close contacts and collaboration with USIS agency in Bratislava, which served as a basis of present-day InfoUSA, a library and information centre.
- in 2004 a separate collection dedicated to Russian literature originated at ULB and the Centre for Russian Studies was founded
- in May 2005 Austrian Library was set up at ULB upon an initiative of the Austrian Embassy
- in 2006 the Slovak PEN Centre decided to donate its book collections of the World PEN Library to the ULB
- in 2006 the Czech Library was set up as a counterpart of the Slovak Library at the Czech National Library in Prague
- since 2006 the ULB collections are enriched by the French Library which is developed under the auspices of the French Embassy in Slovakia
- in 2007 British Centre was opened in close collaboration with the British Council with a vast collection of British literature focused primarily on English language teaching.
- Geothe Institut Bratislava ranks among the strategic partners of the Library, it has been giving long-standing support to international activities as seminars, exhibitions and training programmes
- Information Centre of the Council of Europe has its seat at the Library as well

Bilateral agreements on cooperation with the closest and most respected partners :

- National Library of the Czech republic in Prague
- Moravian Library in Brno
- Research Library in Olomouc
- National Library of Poland in Warsaw
- National Szechényi Library in Budapest
- Austrian National Library in Vienna

Bilateral cooperative projects :

- KOBIB with Bielefeld Library focusing on electronic delivery of documents and transfer of new library technologies from Germany to Slovakia
- CASLIN project which helped raise the standard of automation in Czech and Slovak libraries

Among prestigious foreign partners of ULB through project World Digital Library are :

- Bibliotheca Alexandrina in Alexandria
- National Library of Iran
- Library of Congress in Washington

Participation in European programmes: COPERNICUS, IST, FP4, FP6, eTEN, ENRICH, MICHAEL Plus, EZB project, Minerva

The University Library includes the Bašagić Collection of Islamic Manuscripts. The collection is part of the UNESCO Memory of the World. It became a part of the register in 1997. It includes works by Sayf al-Din al-Amidi.

== Library in annual report 2015 ==
- 240 employees
- over 20,000 active users
- over 500 places for users (working stations)
- over 50 places for users with library computers
- over 6.800,000 users in online services
- over 13,000 visitors of culture and education events
- over 2.700,000 items in collections

== Digital Library ==
The Digital Library of the University Library in Bratislava is an independent collection of digitzed items - periodicals, old prints, music works or monographies in user-attractive layout. The Digital library offers access to more than 1.100,000 fulltext pages of slovacical items, mostly periodicals.

=== Features and advanced tools ===
The most essential software feature is bibliographic information of individual content and advanced search. The content of the Digital library is categorized with added tags presented by faceted display or tree-like structure. User can mark items or their parts as favourite, make annotations and share them with specific person a user can freely define himself. User and „his group“ can comment on the shared annotations and share annotations, collections, objects or specific parts of displayed objects over Facebook, Twitter and Google+. The Digital library software operates effective tools for selection of whole page or selected textual and graphical zones from the original scanned files, which can be copied and translated instantly and be easily extracted into other software applications. All items enable search through the content and hits are shown directly as overlaid highlights on images. It is also possible to search the content via metadata or date in combination with categories. Search results can be visually organized and sorted according to various criteria.

=== Accessed items ===
The Digital library offers free access to items out of copyright for all users without restrictions via internet. Items protected by the copyright law are accessible for registered users from the library's network only.

=== Content ===
The frame of the Digital library is made by textbooks for students (elementary and high school, university), encyclopaedias, dictionaries, handbooks, scientific publications, fiction, periodicals (daily papers, weekly papers, entertainment and political journals). Among the most interesting works of the Digital library there are several works of Comenius (Janua Linguarum Reserata and Orbis Pictus) and works of old Slovak great writers and personalities, as J. M. Hurban, A. Bernolak, M. Hattala, J. Palarik, J. Ribay and S. Tesedik. In the collection of 19th and early 20th century periodicals there are Pressburger Zeitung, Slovenske pohlady, Dom a skola, Domova pokladnica, Hlas, Deres, Prudy, periodicals from the first half of the 20th century are Gemer-Malohont, Slovenská Pravda, Slovenský hlas, Narodna jednota, Pohronie. The period of the WWII is represented by Gardista, Slovak, Kulturny zivot, Sloboda, Novy svet and Elan. Works by Richard Strauss, E. Suchon and many song-books can be found in music works collection.

== See also ==
- List of libraries in Slovakia
