= National Pedagogical Museum and Library of J. A. Comenius in Prague =

Museum in Prague

National Pedagogical Museum and Library of J. A. Comenius
- Národní pedagogické muzeum a knihovna J. A. Komenského

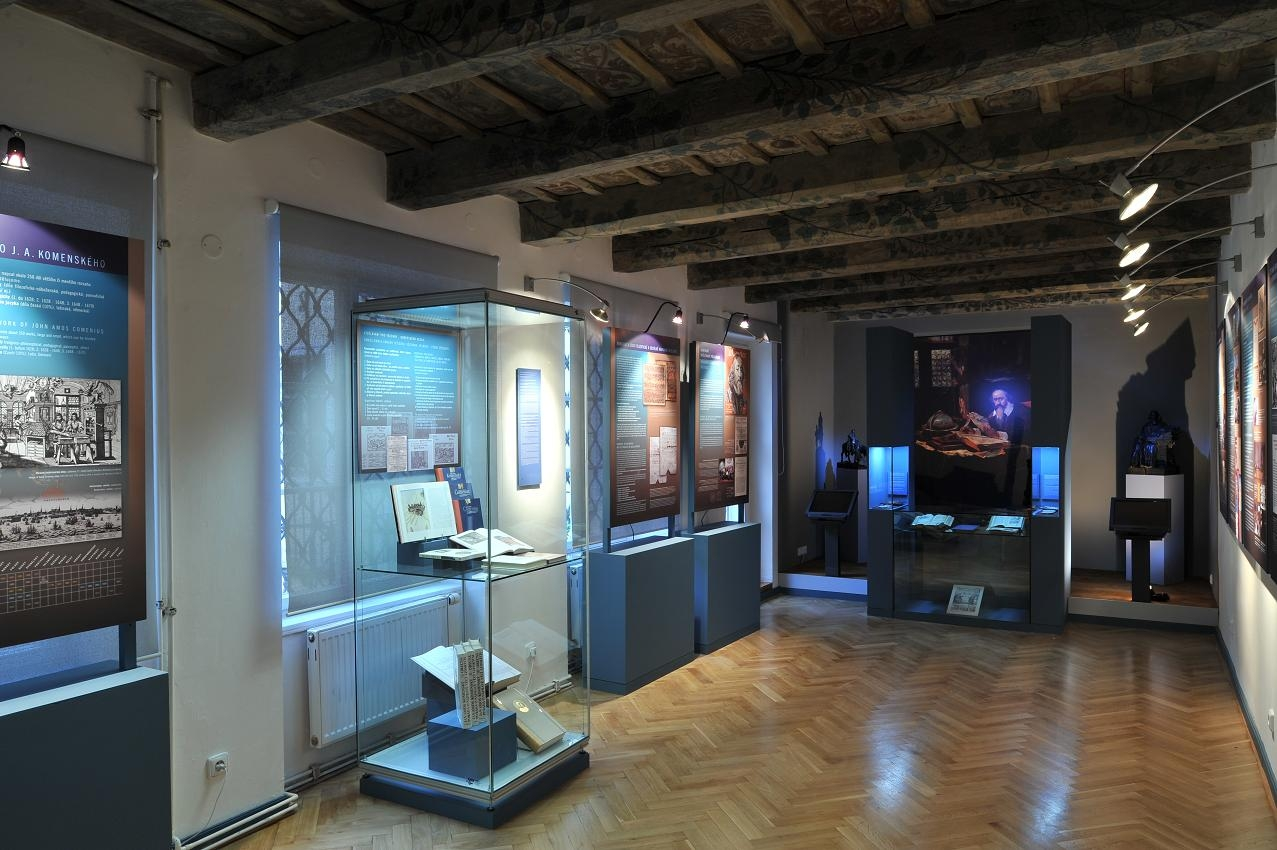
- Interactive fullscreen map
- Established: 2011; 15 years ago
- Location: Valdštejnská 161/20, Prague 1, Czech Republic, 118 00
- Coordinates: 50°5′25.39″N 14°24′19.09″E
- Website: https://www.npmk.cz/

The National Pedagogical Museum and Library of J. A. Comenius (Czech: Národní pedagogické muzeum a knihovna J. A. Komenského) is an institution in Prague that was created in 2011 by merging of two institutions: Pedagogical Museum (Valdstejnska 5) and Pedagogical Library of J. A. Comenius (Jeruzalemska 12).

== Museum of J. A. Comenius ==
The museum was established in 1892 in Prague as an expression of the Czech teacher's efforts to preserve and document traditions of Czech school system and pedagogy. It is one of the oldest museums in the Czech Republic. Since 1991, it has belonged to the Ministry of Education, Youth and Sports of the Czech Republic. The museum is a research and resource centre focused on the history of Czech education, pedagogy, teachers and educatedness, referring to the life, work and legacy of John Amos Comenius.

Since 1996 it has found a new location in historical buildings dating back to the 14th century: The Golden Sun and The Golden Ship houses.

The collections comprise library items specialised in the development of Czech education in the European context, of an archive of written documents by classical authors in the field of pedagogy (including the so-called Slavín), a photo-archive and a collection of precious teaching aids including school pictures, graphic sheets, artistic prints and maps.

The Přemysl Pitter and Olga Fierz Archive forms an inseparable part of the museum.

== Pedagogical Library ==
The Pedagogical Library of J. A. Comenius in Prague is a public specialized pedagogical library contains books and magazines of education, upbringing and related sciences. The beginnings of the library are closely linked with the modern history of the independent Czechoslovak state. It came into existence in 1919 as a part of Czechoslovak Comenius Pedagogical Institute.

== See also ==
- List of libraries in the Czech Republic
