= List of archives in the Czech Republic =

This is list of archives in the Czech Republic.

== Archives in the Czech Republic ==
- National Archives (Czech Republic)
- Archive of the National Museum (Prague)
- State Regional Archive in Trebon
- State Regional Archive in Litomerice
- State Regional Archive in Prague
- Moravian Land Archive, Brno
- Land Archive, Opava
- Land Archive, Olomouc
- Prague's Castle Archive
- Charles University Archives
- Prague City Archives
- Brno City Archive
- Ostrava City Archive
- Plzen City Archive
- Usti nad Labem City Archive

== See also ==
- List of archives
- List of libraries in the Czech Republic
- List of museums in the Czech Republic
- Culture of the Czech Republic
