= Slavonic Library in Prague =

Public library in Prague

Coordinates: 50°5′10.5″N 14°25′1″E

Slavonic Library
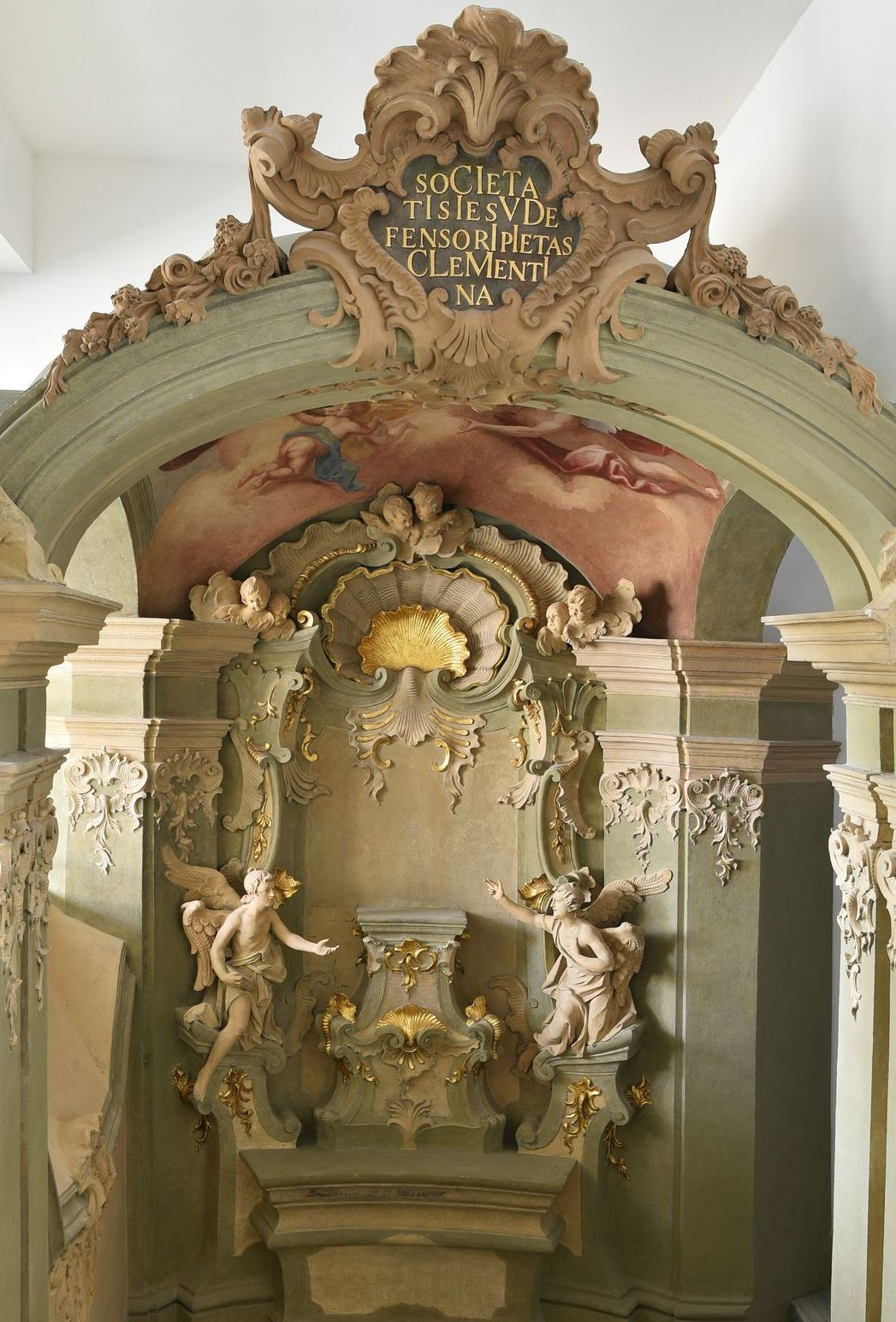
- Entrance to Slavonic Library
- Established: 1924
- Address: Klementinum 190, Prague 1
- Location: Prague, Czech republic
- Website: https://www.nkp.cz/slovanska-knihovna

The Slavonic Library (Czech: Slovanská knihovna) in Prague is a publicly accessible specialised research library for the field of Slavic Studies. It is one of the largest and most important Slavic libraries in Europe. Since its foundation in 1924, it has been systematically complementing, processing and making accessible its collection of world research Slavic (mainly historical, philological and political-science) literature and selected original production of Slavic authors. Its depositories contain more than 850,000 volumes of library documents, a collection of maps, posters, visual and artistic materials, and numerous collections of special documents.

The Slavonic Library provides library and information services concerning the political, economic and cultural life of the Slavic nations, their mutual relations and their relations to other nations in the past as well as the present. Documents can be studied in the library's public reading room, provided with free internet access, an extensive reference library and open-access shelving with a large number of volumes.

The library processes and edits specialised bibliographies and publications in its field. It organizes cultural events, professional seminars, conferences and exhibitions. Following the decision of the International Committee of Slavists, it has fulfilled the function of the centre for recording and processing materials related to the international congresses of Slavists.

The Slavonic Library is a section of the National Library of the Czech Republic but acts autonomously in professional library issues. It consists of departments for collection acquisitions, cataloguing and for services.

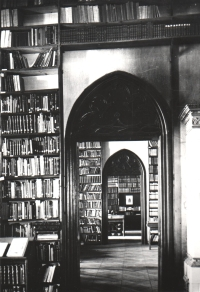
Interior of Governor Summer House in Prague - former seat of Slavonic Library

== The History of the Slavonic Library ==
The library was founded in 1924 by the Ministry of Foreign Affairs of the Czechoslovak Republic as its Russian Library. Its establishment was related to the so-called Russian Action of the Czechoslovak government, initiated by President T. G. Masaryk. The programme provided unprecedented aid to émigrés from the area of the emerging Soviet Union. The foundation of the library had been initiated by the Russian literary historian, bibliographer and journalist Vladimir Nikolaevich Tukalevskii (1881‒1936), who headed the library in the first years of its existence. Tukalevskii donated his entire private book collection imported from Russia to the library to form the basis of its future collections.

In 1927, the library began to acquire literature of other Slavic nations and changed its name to the ‘Slavonic Library of the Ministry of Foreign Affairs’. The financial generosity of the Czechoslovak government made it possible to accumulate a remarkable collection of books within a short time – by the end of the 1930s, its book collections already comprised more than 220,000 volumes.

The Slavonic Library was originally housed in the Governor's Summer Palace in the Royal Game Reserve in Prague-Bubeneč. This space was no longer sufficient for the rapidly growing collection. The Ministry of Education and National Enlightenment thus offered the library a shelter in the Klementinum. The Slavonic Library moved there in 1929 and has been there ever since. At the end of December 1938, the library ceased to be controlled by the Ministry of Foreign Affairs. In February 1942, the library was transferred under German administration and merged with the Land and University Library. The Second World War was a very difficult time for the operation of the library, but its actual library activities were not paralysed.

After the war, especially in the first half of the 1950s, the character of the library was significantly compromised by acquisitions of unrelated Soviet literature. In 1956, the Slavonic Library gradually began to return to its original mission. It revived its original scheme of acquisition and international cooperation, in particular in the exchange of publications. Nevertheless, it was not possible to renew the scientific activities of the Slavonic Library and re-establish the severed ties with western institutions focused on Slavic Studies until the social and political changes in 1989.

In 1958, the Slavonic Library was incorporated into the State (now National) Library as its autonomous section and has remained so to this day.

== The Book Collection ==
The book collection of the Slavonic Library comprises more than 850,000 library units (as of June 2018). On average, it is augmented by 9,000 new volumes of books and several hundred titles of periodicals every year. It is a varied collection of Slavic Studies literature, complexly mapping the historical, literary, philological and cultural topics of all Slavic nations. The core of individual national sections is formed by personal libraries acquired through donation or purchase in the first decades of the library's existence. Since the early 1930s, the acquisitions were carried out systematically according to a thematic plan of acquisition.

The Slavonic Library owns several hundred historical manuscript books and several thousand early printed books published before 1800, but most of the collection is formed by the production of the 19th‒21st centuries. The holdings are complemented by a number of collections of special non-library documents.

Almost all catalogue records of books and periodicals are available in the electronic catalogue of the Slavonic Library. Likewise the scanned general card catalogue of the Slavonic Library, used until 1996, and the scanned card catalogue of the Russian Historical Archives Abroad from 1923 to 1945 are accessible. The inventory lists of available collections of special documents can be found in the catalogue Special Collections of the Slavonic Library.
Important Collections

The most valuable parts of the holdings include several thematically coherent collections.

The Library of A. F. Smirdin contains more than 11,000 volumes of Russian literature published between the 1700s and the middle of the 19th century. The collection was created by the bookseller, publisher and cultural benefactor Alexandr Fillippovich Smirdin (1795‒1857) from Saint Petersburg.

A unique collection related to Dubrovnik, Croatia, is the collection of Ragusan literature, created by the Croatian Slavist, Prof. Milan Rešetar (1860–1942). This thematically coherent collection contains nearly 2,500 printed books and 250 manuscripts. It comprises works by Dubrovnik writers, Dubrovnik printed books since the 16th century and publications about Dubrovnik issued in the world until the 1920s.

The Russian manuscript tradition is demonstrated by the collection of manuscripts assembled in northern Russia by the folklorist, expert in Old Russian literature and linguist Aleksandr Dmitrievich Grigorʼev (1874–1945). It comprises 68 manuscripts of both sacred and secular character from the 17th–19th centuries written in the River Pinega basin in the Arkhangelsk Gubernia and in the southern shore of the White Sea.

After the Second World War, the Slavonic Library was enriched by collections created by the Russian Historical Archives Abroad, an archival-documentary institution unique in the world, which existed in Prague in 1923‒1945. The archives collected archival and printed documents concerning the revolutionary movement in Russia at the turn of the 20th century, the First World War in Russia, the revolutionary events of 1917, the Civil War, the development in the USSR and the phenomenon of the Russian anti-Bolshevik emigration. In 1945, the archives were closed and the archival collections were handed over to the USSR, while the collections of books, magazines and newspapers became part of the Slavonic Library.

The Slavonic Library is one of the central institutions that make it possible to study the phenomenon of the political emigration from the territory of the Russian Empire after 1917. The books and periodicals issued by Russian, Ukrainian and Belarusian émigrés all over the world mainly in 1918–1945 form a collection that is unique in the world. Most of these documents were gathered by the Russian Historical Archives Abroad. The books and periodicals are complemented by several collections of archival character, a collection of the works of art by Ukrainian émigrés, and collections of invitations and posters documenting the public life in emigration. In 2007, UNESCO included the Slavonic Library's collection of periodicals issued by Russian, Ukrainian and Belarusian émigrés in 1918–1945 in its Memory of the World International Register.

=== Collections of Special Documents ===
A valuable part of the holdings is the section of special collections containing documents of non-library character. Many of them are related to the topic of Russian and Ukrainian emigration of the interwar period: these are parts of the personal estates of the Russian émigrés Petr N. Savitskii, Antonii V. Florovskii, Alfred L. Bem and Vladimir N. Tukalevskii; the collection of the administrative documents of the Russian Historical Archives Abroad; and the collection of leaflets and invitations to cultural and social events of Russian and Ukrainian émigrés related to the activities of diverse Ukrainian organisations functioning in interwar Czechoslovakia. Another unique collection is the set of more than a thousand hand-painted posters and leaflets made by Ukrainian émigrés in former Czechoslovakia between 1918 and 1945.

Other interesting documents include the correspondence of the Lusatian cultural figure Michał Hórnik, the protoiereus Nikolai N. Ryzhkov, the Ukrainian poet Lesia Ukrainka, the documents of the Leningrad artist Vadim M. Rokhlin, and the archive of clippings of articles about Yugoslavia from Czech periodicals in 1934‒1939. The items preserved in fragments include the correspondence of famous writers (P. I. Chaadaev, L. N. Tolstoi, F. M. Dostojevskii, A. M. Remizov and others) as well as many other documents mainly from the 19th century and the beginning of the 20th century concerning Slavic culture.

The library also owns several extensive collections of visual materials. The collection of art works made by Ukrainian artists – émigrés, most of whom studied or worked at the Ukrainian Studio of Fine Arts in Prague, contains more than 500 documents. It mainly comprises works by 43 artists, many of whom (for example Vasyl Kasiian, Halyna Mazepa, Ivan Kulets, Nataliia Gerken-Rusova and Mykola Bytynskyi) later won international recognition. Also the origin of the collection of 161 Ukrainian ex libris is connected with these émigrés. The core of the collection of posters, comprising several thousand units, is formed by Russian posters from the First World War, the revolutionary year of 1917, the Civil War and the first decades of the existence of the USSR. The collection of photographs (often hand-coloured) from Subcarpathian Rus', Slovakia and Moravian Slovakia made by the Czech official, translator and amateur photographer Rudolf Hůlka (1887–1961) in the 1920s is of significant value for ethnography, the history of architecture and research into everyday life.

The collection of historical maps is quite varied, albeit not very big. It comprises several hundred original maps (including several hand-drawn maps), representing the entire Slavic world from the end of the 16th century until the middle of the 20th century.
Digitisation and Microfilming

The Slavonic Library continuously implements specialised microfilming and digitisation projects focused on the preservation and better accessibility of unique and endangered parts of its collections. The access to digital documents and to the information on the existence of a microfilm copy is provided through the electronic catalogue of the Slavonic Library.

Approximately 1,050 titles of periodicals (ca 370,000 pages) were microfilmed by 2012. These mainly included newspapers from the period of the Russian Revolution and Civil War and printed periodicals issued by Russian, Ukrainian and Belarusian émigrés all over the world.

Within the National Programme for the Digitisation of Rare Documents Memoriae Mundi Series Bohemica (LPIS 6), especially the most precious historical manuscripts are digitised. Early printed books, published before 1800, and the book and magazine production of the 19th century (more than 34,000 documents) have been digitised thanks to a joint project of the National Library of the CR and Google. As part of the development of the National Digital Library, the printed production issued by Russian, Ukrainian and Belarusian émigrés in 1918–1945 in Czechoslovakia is being digitised (the state of digitisation as of June 2018: 255 titles of periodicals and 1,800 volumes of monographs).

== Other Scientific Activities ==
Within the scope of its activities, the Slavonic Library is involved in the implementation of a number of Czech as well as international scientific, bibliographical, library science or publishing projects. It organises conferences, lectures and prepares popularising exhibitions.

=== Publication Activities ===
The library mainly processes and edits specialised bibliographies and special lists of literature. It also publishes paper proceedings and books presenting its collections. It issues the electronic quarterly New Acquisitions of Slavic Studies Publications in the Collections of the Slavonic Library.

=== International Congresses of Slavists – Bibliography ===
Following the decision of the International Committee of Slavists, the Slavonic Library has fulfilled the function of the centre for recording and processing published papers and other materials related to the international congresses of Slavists since 1973. The bibliographies of all organised congresses are available in the form of the electronic database BibSlavKon, which has been developed by the SL in cooperation with the Eastern Europe Department of the Berlin State Library.

=== The Rudolf Medek Prize ===
The Slavonic Library and the Russian Tradition association annually award the Rudolf Medek Prize to remarkable figures focused on the issues of Czech-Russian relations (Czechoslovak-Soviet) relations, the modern history of Central and Eastern Europe, and the promotion of democracy and the pro-European orientation of the Czech Republic.

== See also ==
- List of libraries in the Czech Republic

== Literature ==
- Rachůnková, Zdeňka (2002). The Slavonic Library. Prague: National Library of the Czech Republic. pp. 3-28. ISBN 8070503947.
- Vacek, Jiří (2016). Slovanská knihovna - můj osud. Prague: National Library of the Czech Republic. ISBN 9788070506714.
- 2Strnadel, Jiří (1976). Padesát let Slovanské knihovny v Praze. Prague: Státní knihovna ČSR - Slovanská knihovna. pp. 73–122..
- Řeháková, Michaela; Babka, Lukáš (2005). Soupis publikací vydaných Slovanskou knihovnou )1924 - 2004) [The List of Publications Issued by the Slavonic Library (1924–2004). Published on the Occasion of the 80th Anniversary of the Activities of the Slavonic Library]. Prague: National Library of the Czech Republic - Slavonic Library. ISBN 8070504595.M
- Vacek, Jiří; Babka, Lukáš (2009). Voices of the Banished. Periodical Press of the Emigration from Soviet Russia (1918–1945). Prague: National Library of the Czech Republic. ISBN 978-80-7050-559-5.
- Richard J. Kneeley – Edward Kasinec; The Slovanská knihovna in Prague and its RZIA Collection, Slavic Review 51 (1992), no. 1, pp. 122–130.
