= List of libraries in the Czech Republic =

This is a list of libraries in the Czech Republic.

== Libraries by region ==
=== Central Bohemian ===
- Central Bohemian Research Library, Kladno
- Roudnice Lobkowicz Library, Nelahozeves

=== Hradec Králové ===
- Hradec Králové City Library

=== Karlovy Vary ===
- Karlovy Vary Regional Library
- Sokolov City Library

=== Liberec ===
- Regional Scientific Library in Liberec

=== Moravian-Silesian ===
- Library of the University of Ostrava
- Moravian-Silesian Research Library, Ostrava
- Ostrava City Library
- Technical University of Ostrava, Central Library

=== Olomouc ===
- Palacky University Library, Olomouc
- Research Library in Olomouc

=== Pardubice ===
- Regional Library in Pardubice

=== Plzeň ===
- Pilsen City Library
- West Bohemia University Library, Plzeň (Czech: Univerzitní knihovně ZČU v Plzni)

=== Prague ===
- Charles University, Central Library
- Czech National Library of Medicine
- Czech National Library of Technology
- Czech National Museum Library
- Library and Printing House for the Blind
- Libri Prohibiti
- Municipal Library of Prague
- National Library of the Czech Republic
  - Slavonic Library in Prague
- National Pedagogical Museum and Library of J. A. Comenius in Prague
- Parliamentary Library, Parliament of the Czech Republic
- Strahov Monastery Library

=== South Bohemian ===
- South Bohemian Scientific Library, České Budějovice
- University of South Bohemia Library, České Budějovice

=== South Moravian ===
- Jiří Mahen Library in Brno
- Moravian Library, Brno

=== Ústí nad Labem ===
- Jan Evangelista Purkyne University Research Library

=== Vysočina ===
- Municipal Library of Jihlava

=== Zlín ===
- Kroměříž Archbishop's Castle Library

== See also ==
- Association of Library and Information Professionals of the Czech Republic
- Czech literature
- List of archives in the Czech Republic
- Mass media in the Czech Republic

in Czech

- Directory of libraries and information institutions in the Czech Republic (in Czech)
- Legal deposit in Czechia (in Czech)
