= Association of Library and Information Professionals of the Czech Republic =

Czech library association

Association of Library and Information Professionals of the Czech Republic (SKIP)
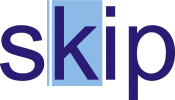
- Founded: 1968(-1970), re-established in 1990
- Type: Civil Association
- Purpose: Librarianship, Professional development, Education
- Location: Klementinum 190, 110 00 Prague 1, Czech Republic
- Region served: Czech Republic
- Method: Professional Meetings, Lifelong learning, Legislative Lobbying, Consultancy, International Cooperation, Media Campaigns
- Members: ca 1400
- Key people: Chairman Roman Giebisch
- Employees: 1
- Website: http://www.skipcr.cz

The Association of Library and Information Professionals of the Czech Republic (Czech: Svaz knihovníků a informačních pracovníků České republiky, SKIP) is a Czech professional organization of librarians and information professionals. It was established in 1968, dissolved in 1970 during the "normalization" period in Czechoslovakia, and re-established in 1990 after the Velvet Revolution. The association has both individual and institutional members (libraries and information institutions). Alongside its headquarters in Prague, SKIP is organised into 11 regional committees.

The association's objectives are to improve the standards of library and information services, to increase the profession’s prestige, to support the development of libraries and information institutions, and to represent the interests of its members. The association publishes the quarterly newsletter Bulletin SKIP. It is a member of the International Federation of Library Associations and Institutions.

== Special interest groups ==
- Public Libraries Section
- Educational Section
- Employers’ Section
- Children Libraries Club
- School Libraries Club
- Academic Librarians Club
- Francophone Club
- Health Libraries Group
- Editorial Commission
- Commission for Foreign Relations

== See also ==
- List of libraries in the Czech Republic
