= Jules Flammermont =

French historian

Jules Gustave Flammermont (5 February 1852, in Chaumont-en-Vexin - 29 July 1899, in Lille) was a French historian, largely known for his writings on history of the 18th century.

He studied at the École pratique des Hautes Études and École des Chartes in Paris, receiving his diploma as an archivist-palaeographer in 1878. He worked as a librarian and archivist in the town of Senlis, and afterwards served as secretary to the Duke of Aumale at the Château de Chantilly. In 1883/84 he conducted archival research in Vienna and Berlin, and in 1884 received his doctorate of letters at the Sorbonne. He successively taught classes in history at the universities of Poitiers (from 1884), Douai (from 1886) and Lille (from 1887). In 1887 he received the title of professor of history and geography of antiquity and the Middle Ages.

== Selected works ==
- Notice sur l'histoire de Senlis au moyen âge, 1877 – On the medieval history of Senlis.
- Histoire de Senlis pendant la second partie de la guerre de cent ans (1405-1441), 1879 - History of Senlis during the second part of the Hundred Years War, (1405–1441).
- Le chancelier Maupeou et les Parlements, 1885 – The chancellor Maupeou and parlements.
- Négociations secrètes de Louis XVI et du baron de Breteuil avec la cour de Berlin, 1885 – Secret negotiations of Louis XVI and the Baron de Breteuil with the Court of Berlin.
- Les jésuites et les parlements au XVIIIe siècle : conférence faite á Poitiers le 7 février 1885 á la Ligue de l'enseignement, 1885 – The Jesuits and parliaments in the eighteenth century.
- Études critiques sur les sources de l'histoire du XVIIIe siècle, I. Les Mémoires de Mme Campan, 1886 - Critical studies on historical sources of the eighteenth century; the memoirs of Jeanne-Louise-Henriette Campan.
- De l'authenticité des mémoires de Talleyrand, 1892 – The authenticity of the memoirs of Talleyrand.
- Album paléographique du Nord de la France; chartes et documents historiques reproduits, 1896 – Palaeographic album of Nord.
- Les portraits de Marie-Antoinette / extrait de la gazette des beaux-arts, 1897 – Portraits of Marie Antoinette; extract from the Gazette of Fine Arts.
- Remontrances du Parlement de Paris au XVIIIe siècle (3 volumes, 1888–98) – Remonstrances of the Parlement of Paris in the eighteenth century.
