= National Library of the Czech Republic =

Central library of the Czech Republic

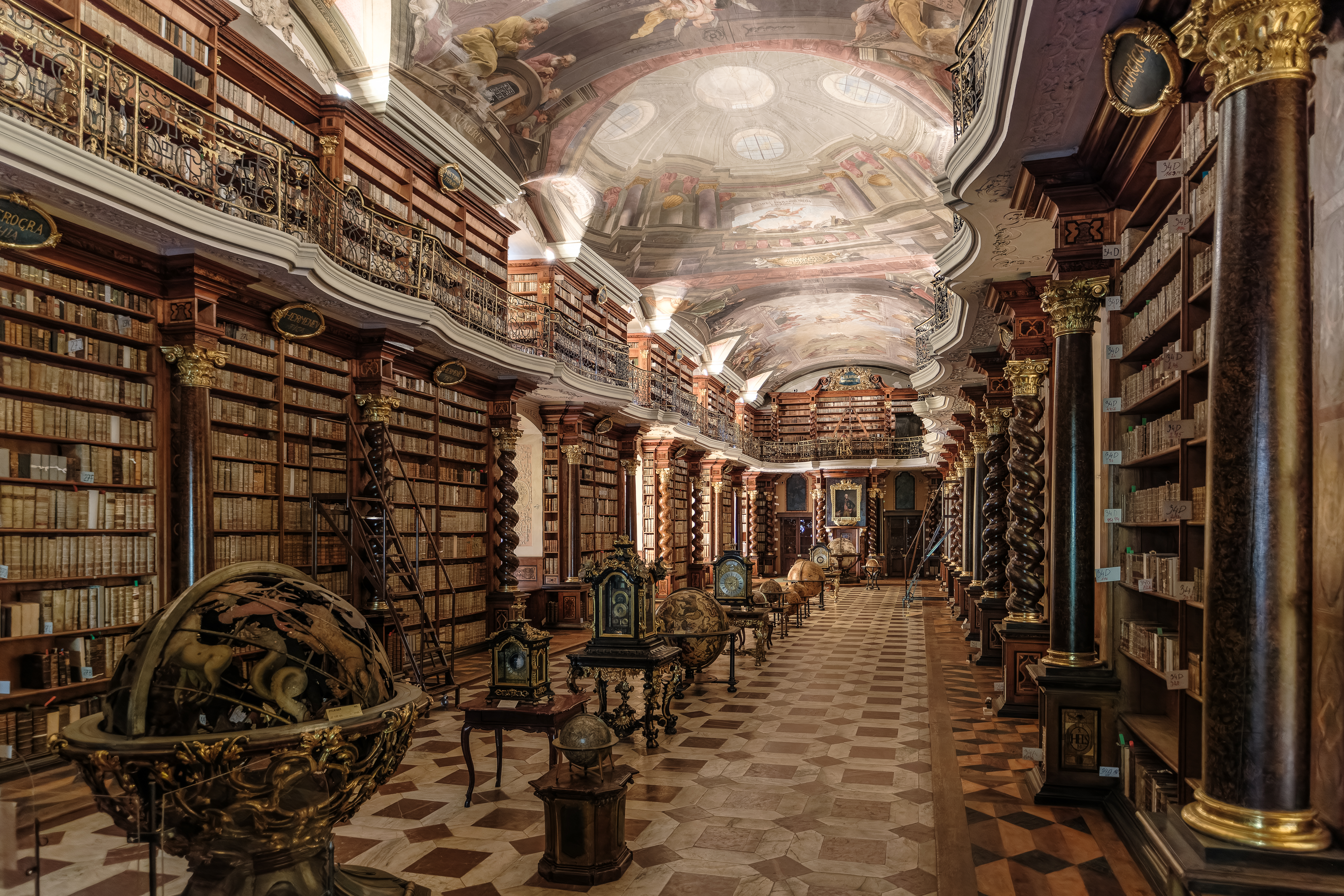
- Baroque library hall in the National Library of the Czech Republic
- 50°5′14.62″N 14°25′2.58″E
- Location: Clementinum, Prague, Czech Republic
- Type: National library
- Established: 1777 (249 years ago)

Collection
- Size: 7,727,350 total items (2023); 22,818 manuscripts c. 4,200 incunabula

Other information
- Director: Tomáš Foltýn
- Website: www.nkp.cz

The National Library of the Czech Republic (Czech: Národní knihovna České republiky) is the central library of the Czech Republic. It is directed by the Ministry of Culture. The library's main building is located in the historical Clementinum building in the centre of Prague, where approximately half of its books are kept. The other half of the collection is stored in the district of Hostivař. The National Library is the biggest library in the Czech Republic, housing around 6 million documents. The library currently has 20 627 registered readers. Although comprising mostly Czech texts, the library also stores older material from Turkey, Iran and India. The library also houses books for Charles University in Prague.

== History ==
In the 13th century, the Studium generale school was founded in the Dominican monastery in Prague's Old Town. This school, including its library, merged with the university in the 14th century.

In 1556, monks of the Jesuit Order erected a boarding school, named Clementinum, on the remains of the Dominican monastery. From 1622 on, the Jesuits also administered the Charles University, and all their libraries were accommodated in the Clementinum.

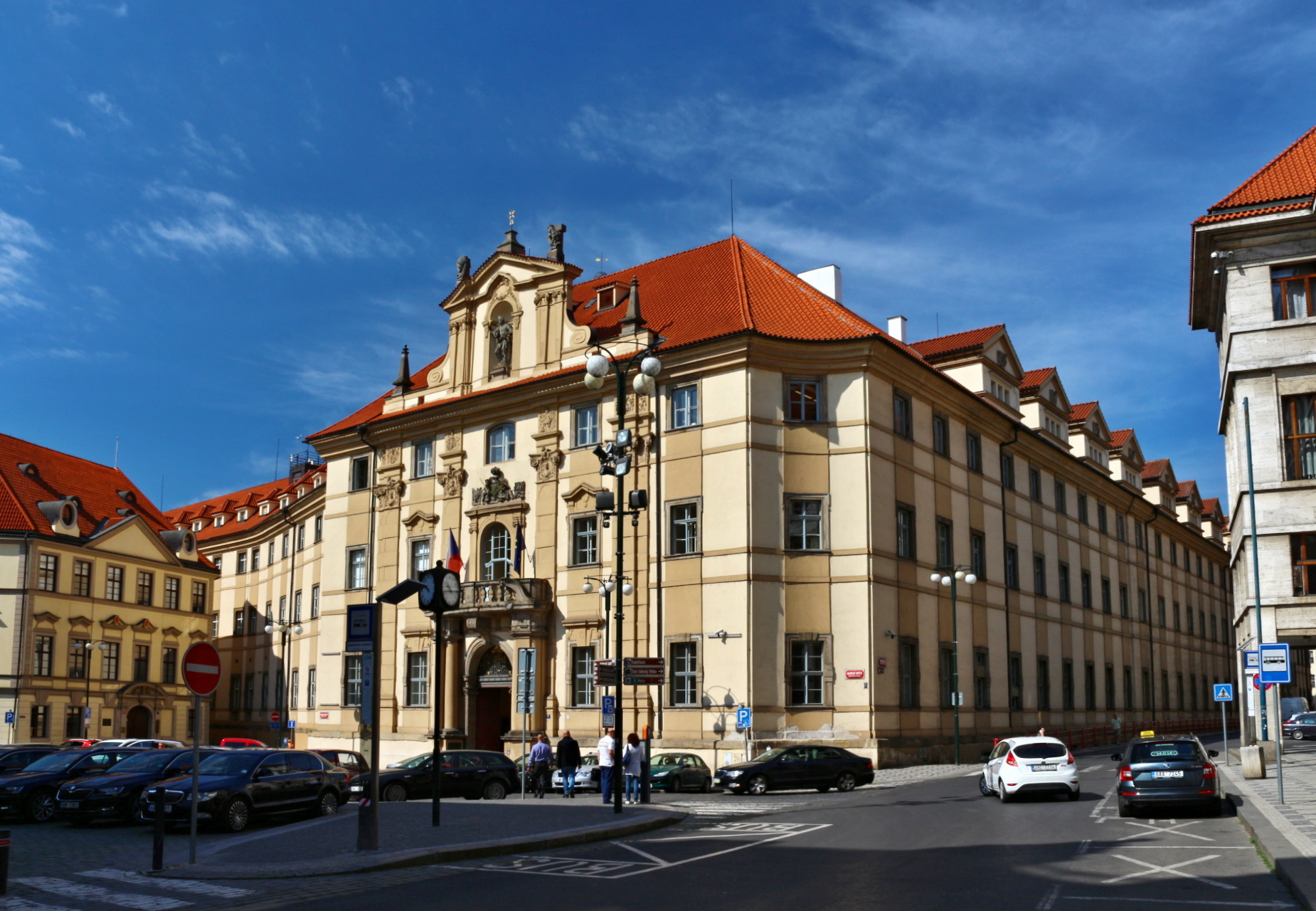
East entrance of the Clementinum

After the suppression of the Jesuits, the university became a state institution in 1773, and in 1777 its library was declared "Imperial-Royal Public and University Library" by Maria Theresa. Even after the splitting of the university into a Czech and a German university in 1882, the library remained as a joint institution.

In 1918, the Public and University Library was taken over by the government of the newly founded Czechoslovakia. In 1924, the Slavonic Library (Slovanská knihovna) was founded, and moved to the Clementinum in 1929; it is still an autonomous part of the National Library. In 1935, the library was renamed "National and University Library" (Národní a univerzitní knihovna). In the same year, a law on the legal deposit copy duty was introduced – a practice dating back to 1781, when Prague printers had to hand in legal deposit copies of their prints to the library.

Although Czech universities and colleges were closed after the German occupation of Czechoslovakia in 1939, the library remained open under the name of "Municipal and University Library" (Zemská a univerzitní knihovna).

In 1958, all large Prague libraries were merged into the single centralized State Library of the Czechoslovak Republic (Státní knihovna CSR).

In 1990, the hitherto last renaming of the library resulted in its current name: National Library of the Czech Republic. A new storage building, the Central Depository in Hostivař, was inaugurated in 1996.

== Collections ==
The most precious medieval manuscripts preserved in the National Library are the Codex Vyssegradensis and the Passional of Abbes Kunigunde.

== Digitisation ==
The National Library of the Czech Republic began with their digitisation efforts in 1992 in collaboration with the Czech company AiP Beroun. In these efforts, the National Library conducted pioneer work on a global scale in the creation of digitization standards. Later, it got involved in a number of European projects, in which it came to additional developments particularly standards regarding manuscripts and old prints. It also supported several pilot projects at the time of their creation and the first years of the UNESCO Memory of the World Programme (with the programme's first pilot project being from the National Library of the Czech Republic in 1993).

The library won international recognition in 2005 as it received the inaugural Jikji Prize from UNESCO's Memory of the World Programme for its efforts in digitising old texts. In its first 13 years since 1992, the project accomplished the digitisation of 1,700 documents and made them publicly available.

The National Library makes its digital content available in the digital libraries Manuscriptorium (http://www.manuscriptorium.com/en) and Kramerius (http://kramerius5.nkp.cz). Manuscriptorium comprises more than 111,000 manuscripts and old prints, with almost 84,000 of them contributed by the National Library and the remainder from 138 partners from 24 countries. Since 2008, when Europeana, the European Union's digital platform for cultural heritage, came into existence, Manuscriptorium contributes manuscripts and old prints digitised by libraries all over the Czech Republic and by other partners to the Europeana platform and several other specialised portals, including professional academic Resource Discovery services, e.g. of EBSCO, ProQuest and ExLibris.

In a collaborative project with Google, additional old prints and early 19th century books from the Slavonic Library have been digitised, with altogether more than 177,000 books digitised by Google (as of October 2018). These books are accessible through the Google Books digital library as well as through the National Library's Catalogue of Old Prints and the Catalogue of the Slavonic Library, and the old prints gradually also through Manuscriptorium.

The Kramerius digital library contains digitised documents published after the year 1800. So far, more than 2,000 periodical series have been digitised. The number of digitized books continues to grow, especially after mass digitization of modern prints in context of the National Digital Library project.

== Proposed new building ==
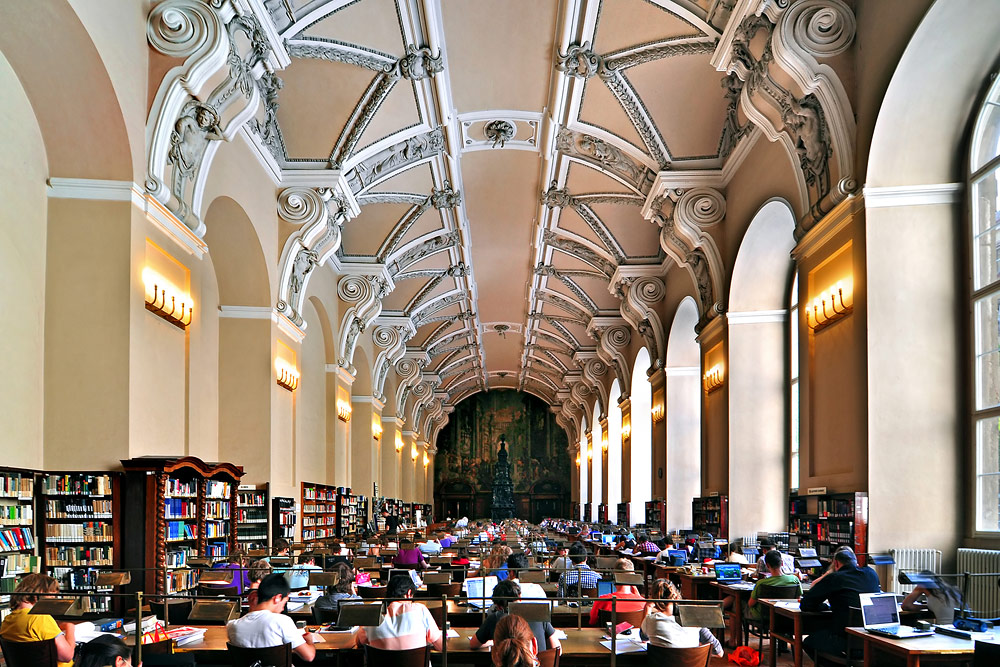
General reading room (former refectory of the Jesuit residence in Clementinum)

In 2006, the Czech parliament approved funding for the construction of a new library building on Letna plain, between Hradčanská metro station and Sparta Prague's football ground, Letná stadium. In March 2007, following a request for tender, Czech architect Jan Kaplický was selected by a jury to undertake the project, with a projected completion date of 2011. Later in 2007 the project was delayed following objections regarding its proposed location from government officials including Prague Mayor Pavel Bém and President Václav Klaus. Plans for the building had still not been decided in February 2008, with the matter being referred to the Office for the Protection of Competition in order to determine if the tender had been won fairly. Later in 2008, Minister of Culture Václav Jehlička announced the end of the project, following a ruling from the European Commission that the tender process had not been carried out legally.

== Incidents ==
The library was affected by the 2002 European floods, with some documents moved to upper levels to avoid the excess water. Over 4,000 books were removed from the library in July 2011 following flooding in parts of the main building. There was a fire at the library in December 2012, but nobody was injured in the event.

== See also ==
- List of national and state libraries
- List of libraries in the Czech Republic
