= Moravian Library =

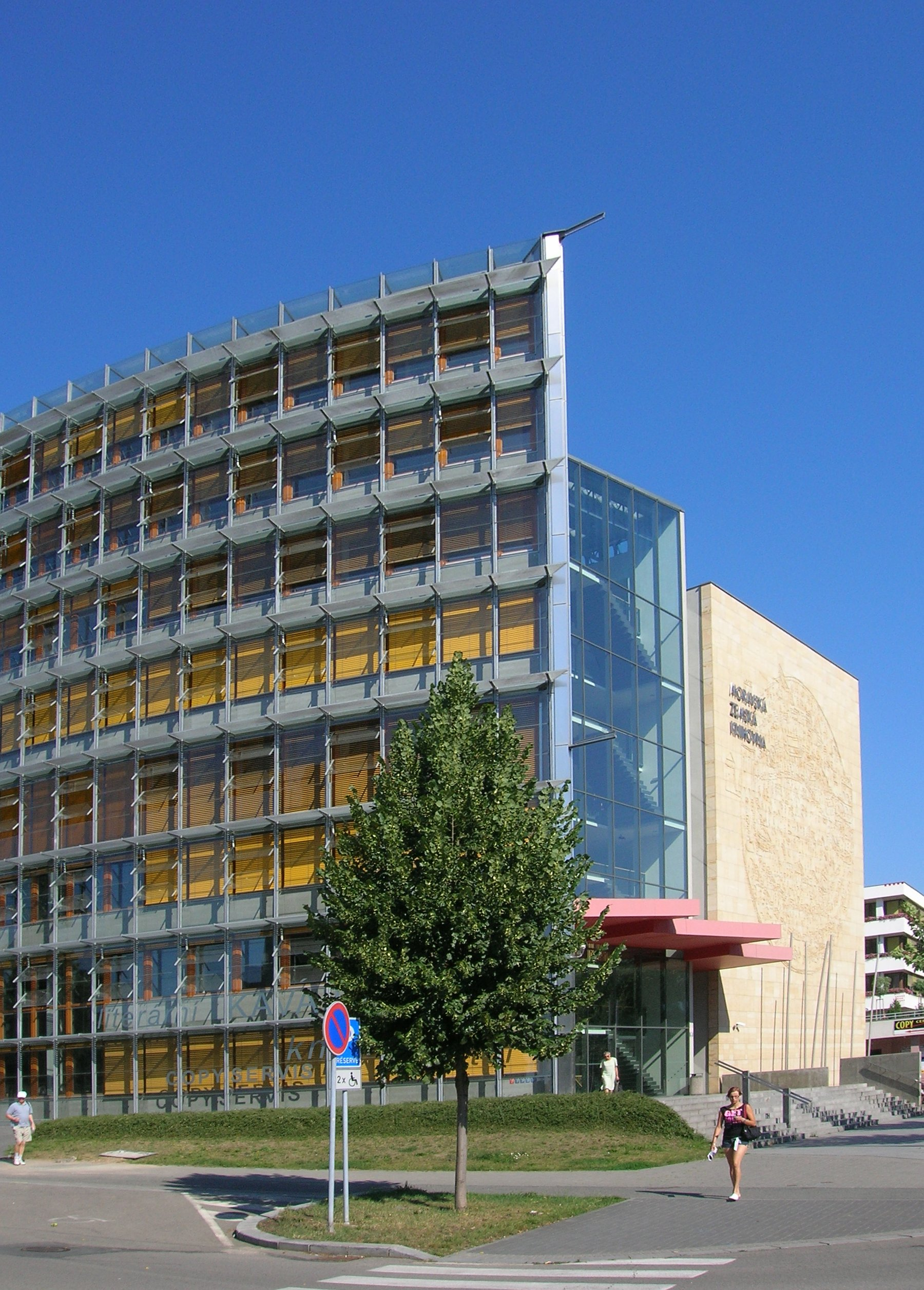
- Moravian Library in Brno
- 49°12′31.14″N 16°35′38.5″E
- Location: Brno, Czech Republic
- Type: Regional library
- Established: 1770 (256 years ago)

Collection
- Size: 4,129,742 total items

Other information
- Director: Tomáš Kubíček
- Website: www.mzk.cz

Moravian Library (Czech: Moravská zemská knihovna) is the second largest library in the Czech Republic. Located in Brno, Czech Republic, it is a universal research library and the regional library of the South Moravian Region.

== History ==
The initial foundations for what would eventually become the Moravian Library began in 1770 with the Library of the Moravian Economic Society. After similar groups came together, this led to the formation of the Moravian- Silesian Society for the Uplift of Tillage, Natural Science and National History and Geography (Czech: Moravskoslezská společnost pro podporu zemědělství, přírodoznalectví a vlastivědu) at the beginning of the 19th century. At this time, the collection was private and was a part of the Františkovo Muzeum. It was opened to the public near the end of the 19th century and officially separated from the Františkovo in 1899. Early on, it grew mainly by donations.

Monasteries throughout Czechoslovakia were dissolved in 1950, with their property, including library collections, confiscated to be divided among state institutions. The Moravian Library retained a large collection of historic materials from the Archives of the Benedictine abbey in Rajhrad. These materials were later returned to the Benedictine library in 2004, but the Moravian Library has remained active in preserving and digitizing them. The library moved to a new building in 2001.

== Services ==
The library holds more than 4 million books, and more than 20,000 people use the library every year. It plays an irreplaceable role in the preservation of cultural heritage and contributes by various projects of digitalization and access to documents. It has a valuable collection of old maps, incunabula and medieval manuscripts.

== See also ==
- List of libraries in the Czech Republic
