= Župčany =

Village and municipality in Slovakia

- Municipality
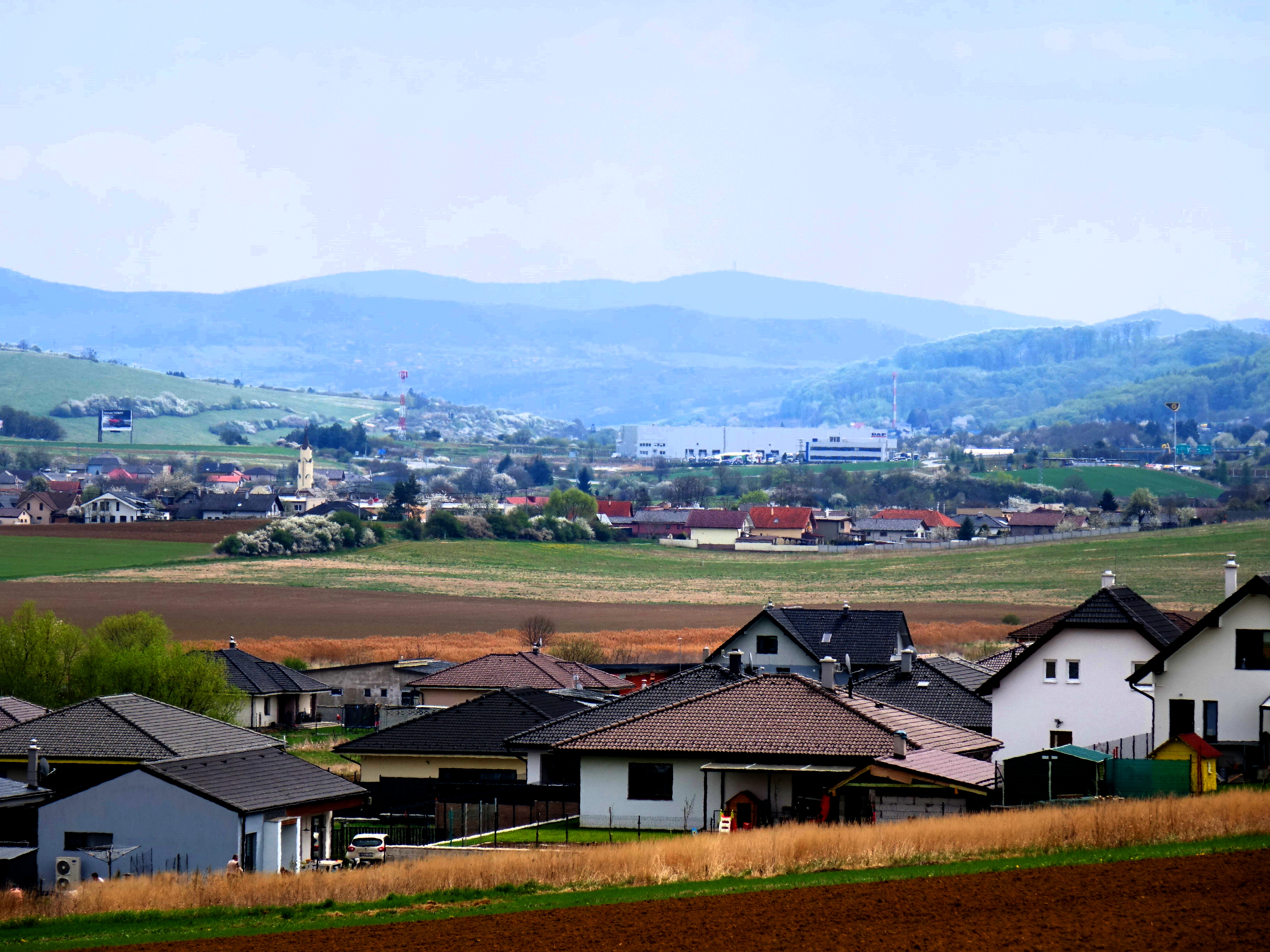

- Flag

- Location of Župčany in the Prešov Region Location of Župčany in Slovakia
- Coordinates: 49.02°N 21.17°E
- Country: Slovakia
- Region: Prešov Region
- District: Prešov District
- First mentioned: 1248

Area
  - Total: 8.49 km^{2} (3.28 sq mi)
- Elevation: 315 m (1,033 ft)

Population (2025)
  - Total: 2,220
- Time zone: UTC+1 (CET)
  - Summer (DST): UTC+2 (CEST)
- Postal code: 800 1
- Area code: +421 51
- Vehicle registration plate (until 2022): PO
- Website: zupcany.sk

Župčany (Hungarian: Zsebefalva) is a village and municipality in Prešov District in the Prešov Region of eastern Slovakia.

== History ==
In historical records the village was first mentioned in 1248.

== Geography ==
The municipality lies at an altitude of 315 metres (1,033 ft) and covers an area of 8.49 km^{2} (3.28 sq mi) (2025).

== Population ==
Population statistic (10 years)
Year	1995	2005	2015	2025
Count	1116	1300	1511	2220
Difference		+16.48%	+16.23%	+46.92%

Population statistic
Year	2024	2025
Count	2139	2220
Difference		+3.78%

It has a population of 2220 people (31 December 2025).

=== Ethnicity ===
Census 2021 (1+ %)
Ethnicity	Number	Fraction
Slovak	1720	95.92%
Not found out	67	3.73%
Total	1793	

In year 2021 was 1793 people by ethnicity 1720 as Slovak, 67 as Not found out, 15 as Rusyn, 8 as Czech, 7 as Other, 4 as Austrian, 3 as Irish, 3 as German, 3 as Hungarian, 1 as Ukrainian, 1 as Italian, 1 as Romani, 1 as Polish and 1 as English.

Note on population: The difference values of population numbers in the table "Population statistic" and in the sections "Ethnicity" & "Religion" is caused by the use of various statistical methods.

=== Religion ===
Census 2021 (1+ %)
Religion	Number	Fraction
Roman Catholic Church	1465	81.71%
None	124	6.92%
Not found out	80	4.46%
Greek Catholic Church	67	3.74%
Evangelical Church	39	2.18%
Total	1793	

In year 2021 was 1793 people by religion 1465 from Roman Catholic Church, 124 from None, 80 from Not found out, 67 from Greek Catholic Church, 39 from Evangelical Church, 9 from Eastern Orthodox Church, 4 from Other, 2 from Calvinist Church, 1 from Christian Congregations in Slovakia, 1 from Church of Jesus Christ of Latter-day Saints and 1 from Ad hoc movements.
