= Research Library in Olomouc =

Public library in Olomouc, Czech Republic

Coordinates: 49°35′37.65″N 17°14′49.42″E

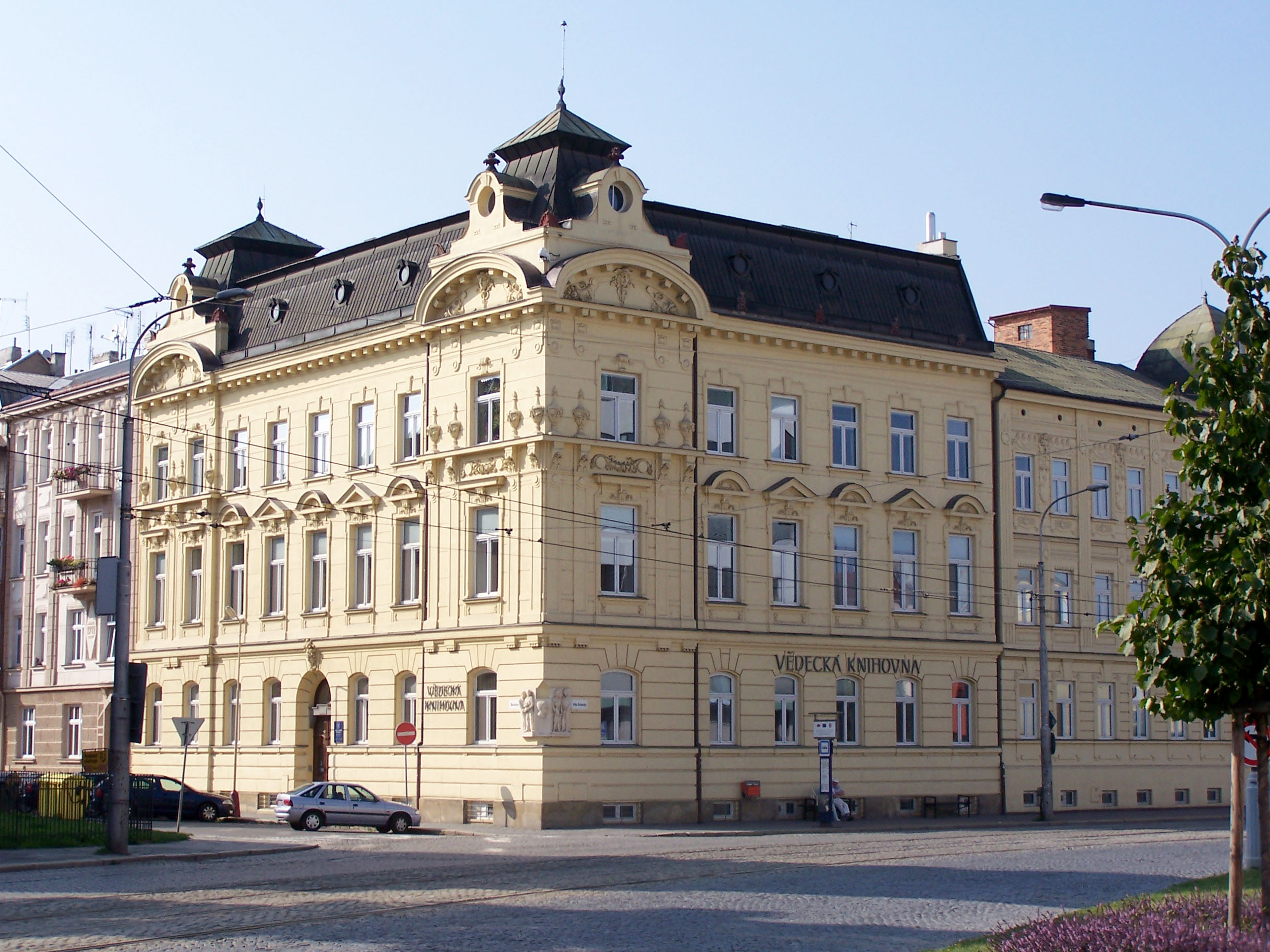
Olomouc Research Library

The Olomouc Research Library (Czech: Vědecká knihovna v Olomouci) is a public library in Olomouc, Czech Republic.

The library was established in 1566 by the Olomouc college and served until 1860 as University of Olomouc Library.

Nowadays it is one of the largest libraries in the Czech Republic with unique collection of historical sources, among others 1451 manuscripts and 1700 incunables.

== See also ==
- List of libraries in the Czech Republic
