= Záborie =

- Municipality
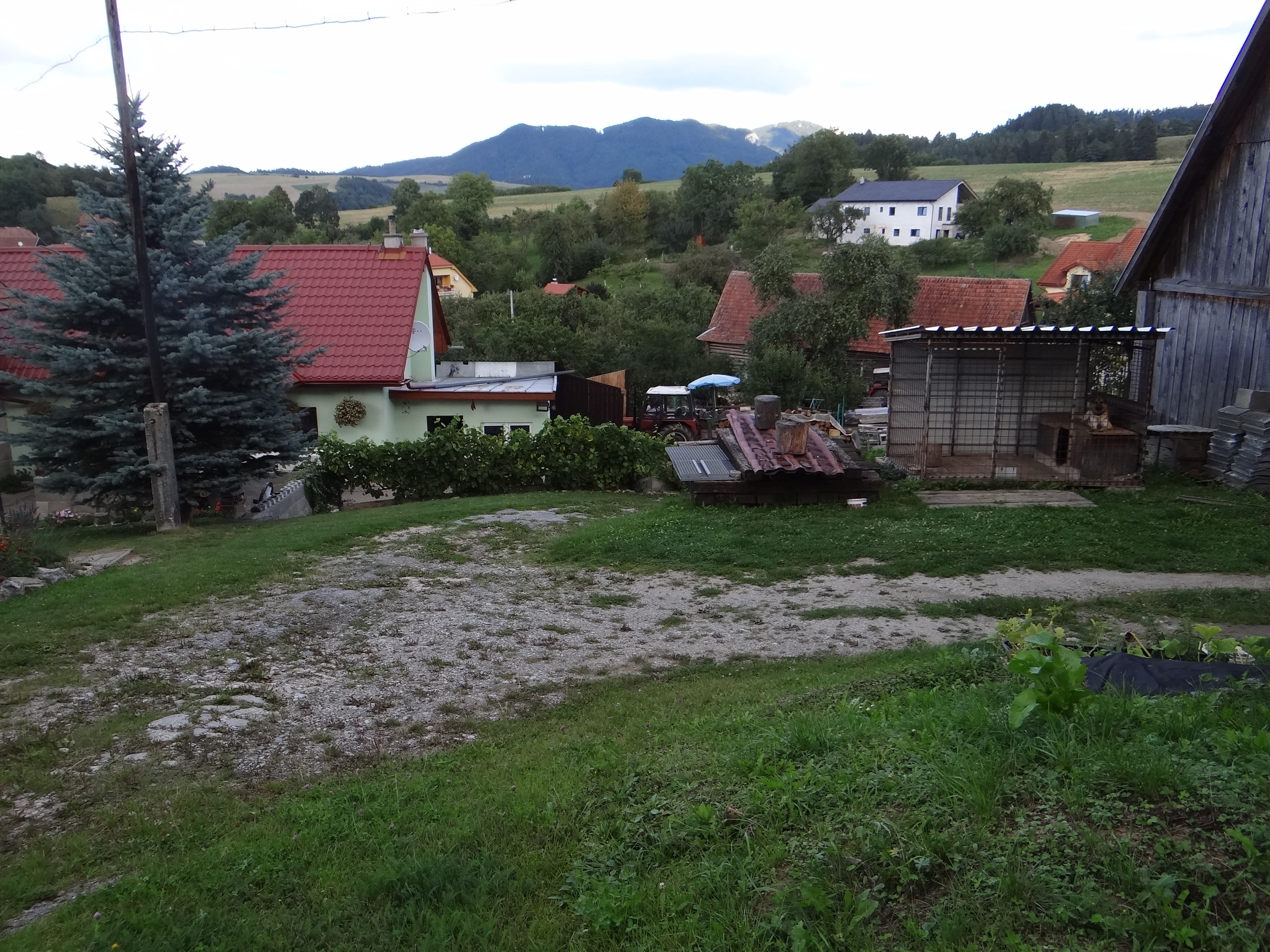

- Location of Záborie in the Žilina Region Location of Záborie in Slovakia
- Coordinates: 49.03°N 18.98°E
- Country: Slovakia
- Region: Žilina Region
- District: Martin District
- First mentioned: 1353

Area
  - Total: 5.19 km^{2} (2.00 sq mi)
- Elevation: 501 m (1,644 ft)

Population (2025)
  - Total: 174
- Time zone: UTC+1 (CET)
  - Summer (DST): UTC+2 (CEST)
- Postal code: 380 2
- Area code: +421 43
- Vehicle registration plate (until 2022): MT
- Website: zaborie.sk

Záborie (Hungarian: Zábor) is a village and municipality in Martin District in the Žilina Region of northern Slovakia.

== History ==
In historical records the village was first mentioned in 1263. Before the establishment of independent Czechoslovakia in 1918, it was part of Turóc County within the Kingdom of Hungary. From 1939 to 1945, it was part of the Slovak Republic.

== Geography ==
The municipality lies at an altitude of 501 metres (1,644 ft) and covers an area of 5.19 km^{2} (2.00 sq mi) (2025).

== Population ==
Population statistic (10 years)
Year	1995	2005	2015	2025
Count	114	123	156	174
Difference		+7.89%	+26.82%	+11.53%

Population statistic
Year	2024	2025
Count	171	174
Difference		+1.75%

It has a population of 174 people (31 December 2025).

=== Ethnicity ===
Census 2021 (1+ %)
Ethnicity	Number	Fraction
Slovak	168	98.82%
Total	170	

In year 2021 was 170 people by ethnicity 168 as Slovak, 1 as Irish, 1 as Russian and 1 as Not found out.

Note on population: The difference values of population numbers in the table "Population statistic" and in the sections "Ethnicity" & "Religion" is caused by the use of various statistical methods.

=== Religion ===
Census 2021 (1+ %)
Religion	Number	Fraction
Evangelical Church	101	59.41%
None	39	22.94%
Roman Catholic Church	28	16.47%
Total	170	

In year 2021 was 170 people by religion 101 from Evangelical Church, 39 from None, 28 from Roman Catholic Church, 1 from Not found out and 1 from Hinduism.
