= Joseph Calasanza von Arneth =

Austrian archaeologist

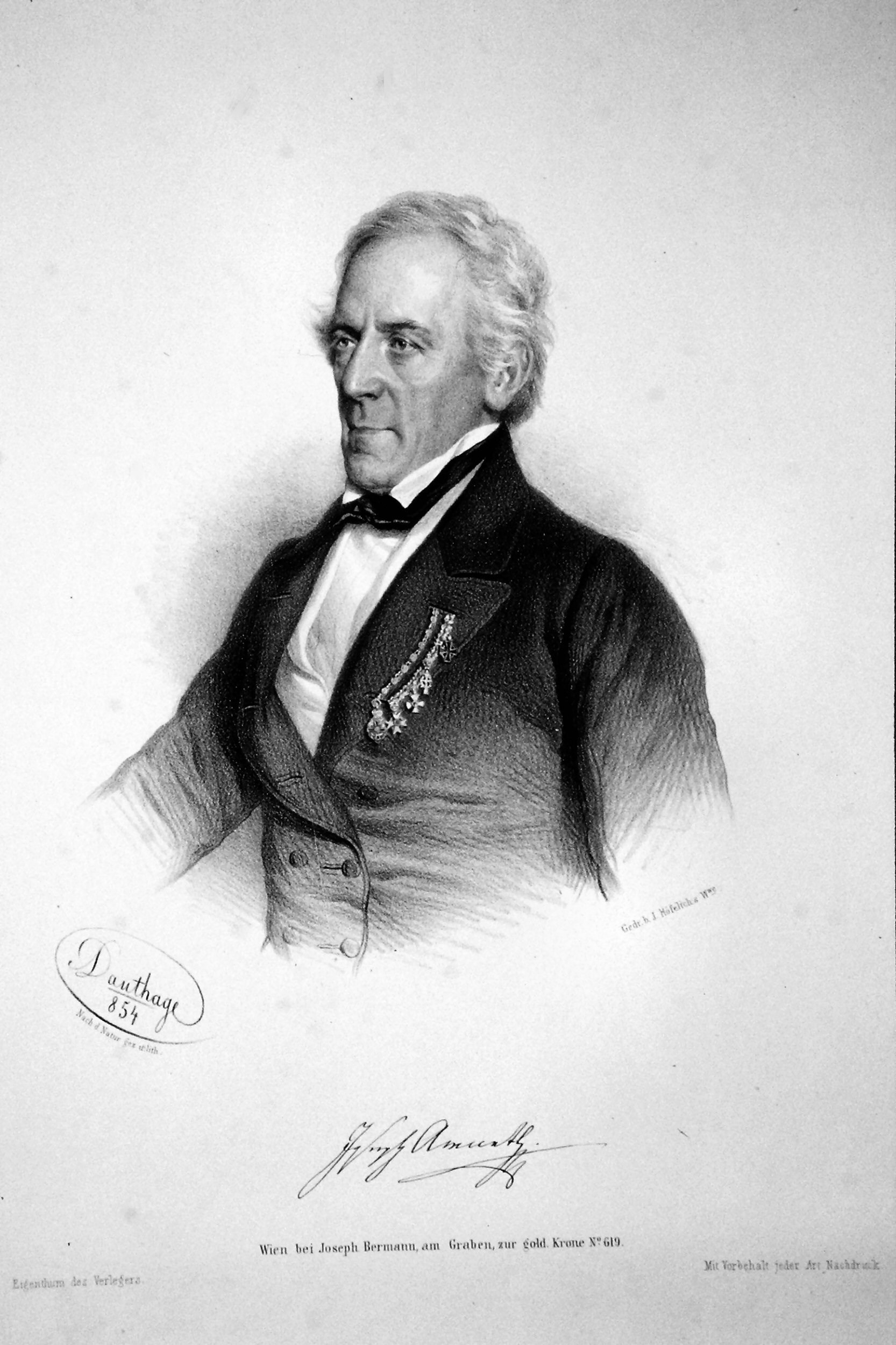
Arneth

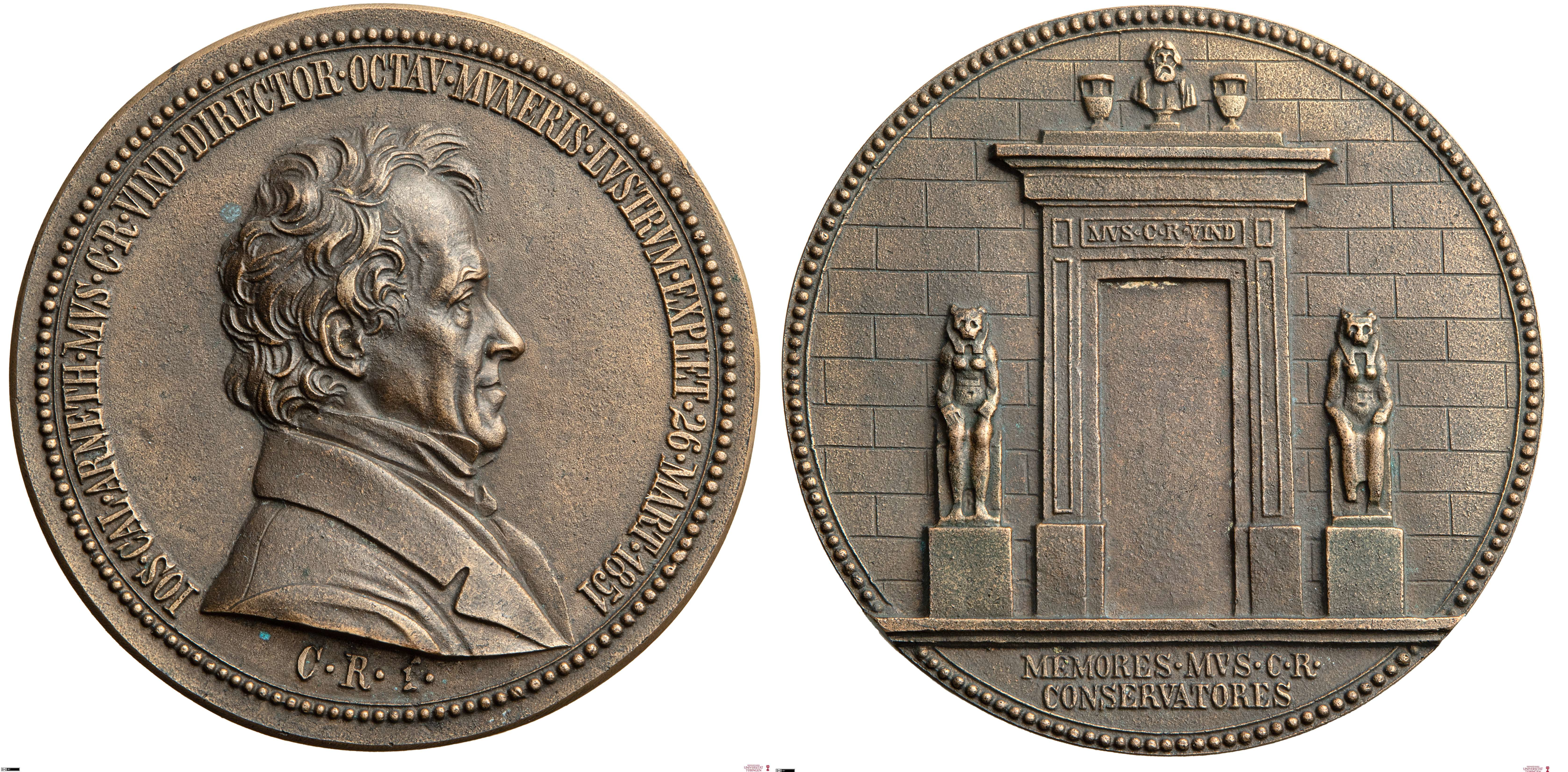
Medal Joseph von Arneth 1851

Joseph Calasanza, Ritter von Arneth (12 August 1791 – 31 October 1863) was an Austrian numismatist and archæologist, born at Leopoldschlag, Upper Austria. He became custodian of the Cabinet of Coins and Antiquities in Vienna, and director of that institution in 1840, in which capacity he rendered very valuable services to the department of numismatics. Among his more important works are:

- Synopsis Numorum Grœcorum (1837)
- Synopsis Numorum Romanorum (1842)
- Das k. k. Münz- und Antikenkabinett (1845)
- Die antiken Kameen des k. k. Munz- und Antikenkabinetts (1849)
- Die Cinque-Cento-Kameen und Arbeiten des Benvenuto Cellini und seiner Zeitgenossen (1858)

He was the father of Alfred von Arneth. In 1851 he received a medal in occasion of his anniversary of working at the Cabinet of Coins and Antiquities in Vienna.
