= Bon Air station =

Pittsburgh train station

Bon Air
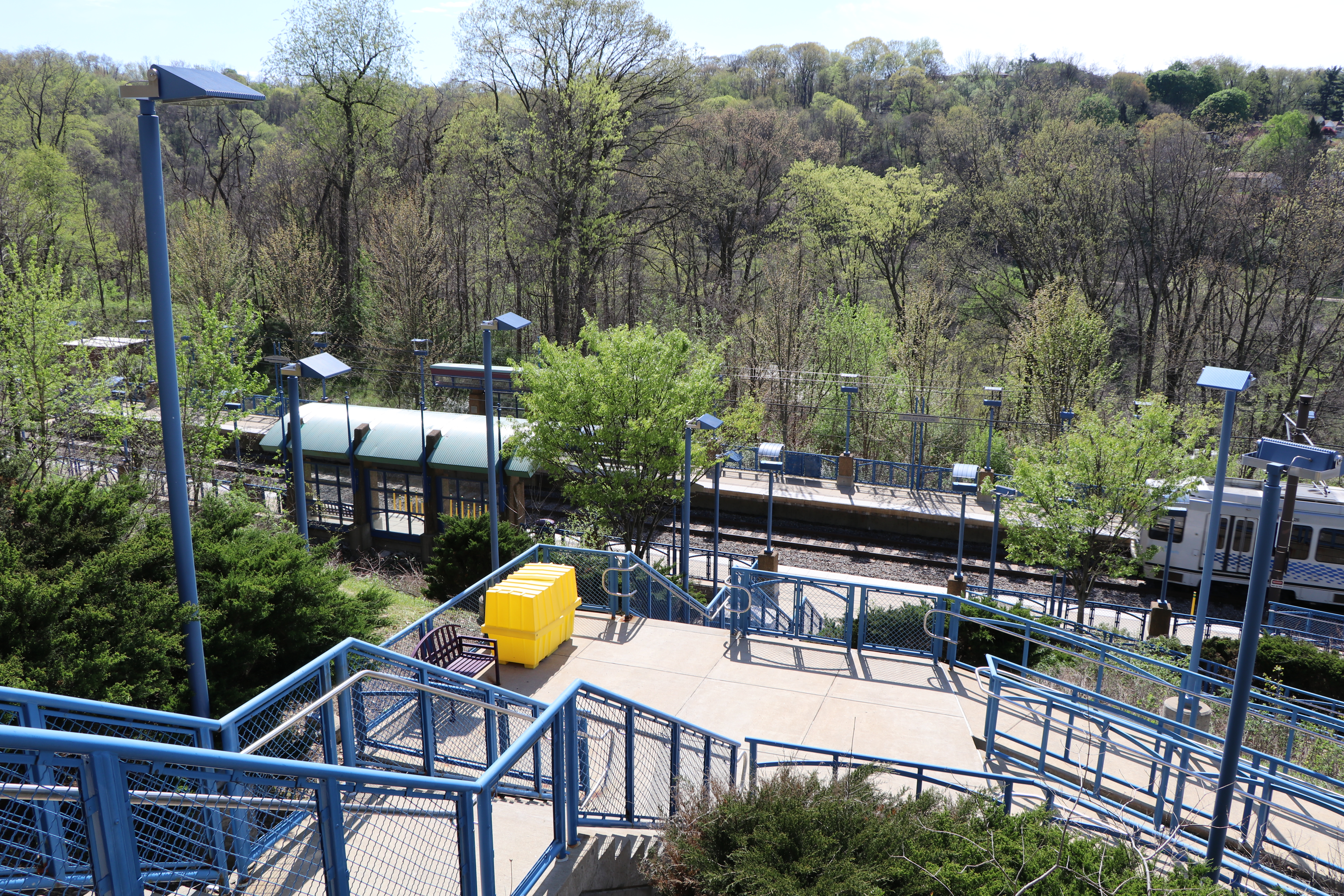
- Looking down on Bon Air station from entrance, April 2017

General information
- Location: Institute Street and Clanton Street; Pittsburgh, Pennsylvania
- Coordinates: 40.4080°N 80.0032°W
- Owner: Pittsburgh Regional Transit
- Line: Overbrook Line
- Platforms: 2 side platforms
- Tracks: 2
- Connections: PRT: 51, 54D

Construction
- Structure type: At-grade
- Accessible: Yes

History
- Rebuilt: 2004

Passengers
- 2018: 62 (weekday boardings)

Services
Preceding station	Pittsburgh Regional Transit	Following station
Boggs toward Allegheny	Blue Line	Denise toward South Hills Village
Boggs toward Allegheny	Silver Line	Denise toward Library
Former services
Preceding station	Port Authority of Allegheny County	Following station
McKinley Park toward Gateway	47D Drake 1984–1993	Edgebrook toward Drake
McKinley Park toward Gateway	47L Library via Overbrook	Edgebrook toward Library
McKinley Park toward Gateway	47S South Hills Village via Overbrook	Edgebrook toward South Hills Village
Location

Bon Air station is a station on the Pittsburgh Light Rail network, operated by Pittsburgh Regional Transit, serving the Bon Air neighborhood of Pittsburgh, Pennsylvania. It has two high-level side platforms for level boarding and is accessible. The station is located in a valley below Roseton Avenue. The station is designed as the primary transit access for residents of this small neighborhood of single-family homes where bus service is limited.

== History ==
Bon Air station opened on June 2, 2004, one of eight new platform-equipped stations which replaced 33 streetcar-style stops along the Overbrook branch.
