= Denise station =

Denise
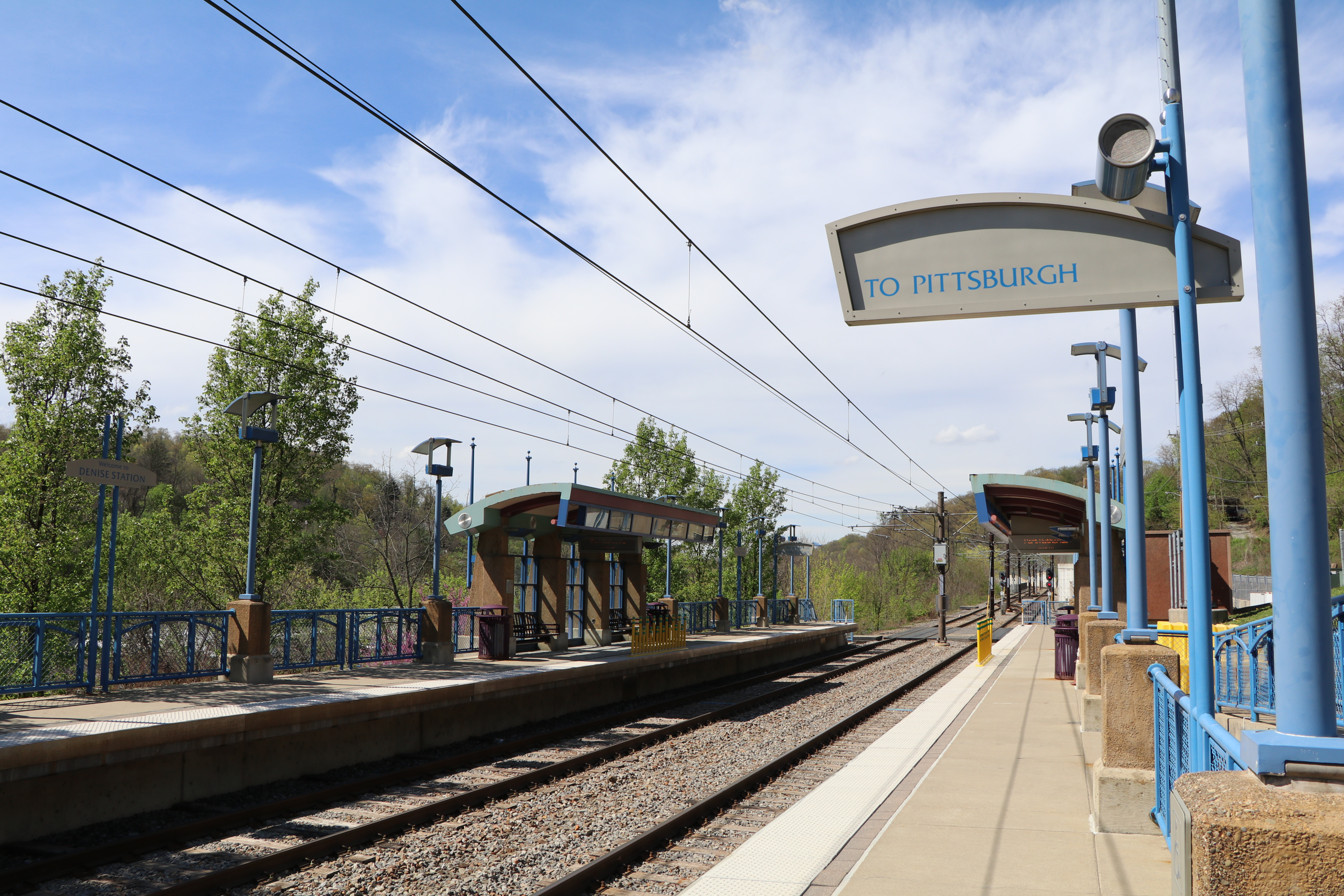
- Denise station platforms, April 2017

General information
- Location: Nobles Lane and Denise Street; Pittsburgh, Pennsylvania
- Coordinates: 40.3996°N 79.9990°W
- Owner: Pittsburgh Regional Transit
- Line: Overbrook Line
- Platforms: 2 side platforms
- Tracks: 2
- Connections: PRT: 51

Construction
- Structure type: At-grade
- Accessible: Yes

History
- Opened: June 2, 2004

Passengers
- 2018: 101 (weekday boardings)

Services
Preceding station	Pittsburgh Regional Transit	Following station
Bon Air toward Allegheny	Blue Line	South Bank toward South Hills Village
Bon Air toward Allegheny	Silver Line	South Bank toward Library
Former services
Preceding station	Port Authority of Allegheny County	Following station
McKinley Park toward Gateway	47D Drake 1984–1993	Edgebrook toward Drake
McKinley Park toward Gateway	47L Library via Overbrook	Edgebrook toward Library
McKinley Park toward Gateway	47S South Hills Village via Overbrook	Edgebrook toward South Hills Village
Location

Denise station is a station on the Pittsburgh Light Rail network, operated by Pittsburgh Regional Transit, serving the Carrick neighborhood of Pittsburgh, Pennsylvania. It has two high-level side platforms for level boarding and is accessible. It serves a commercial corridor along Saw Mill Run Boulevard and a slopeside residential area which extends from the west side of the station.

== History ==
Denise was opened in 2004, replacing the Smith stop in roughly the same location, and consolidating the former Edgebrook stop at the viaduct just to the north.
