= South Bank station (Pittsburgh) =

Railway station in Pennsylvania

South Bank
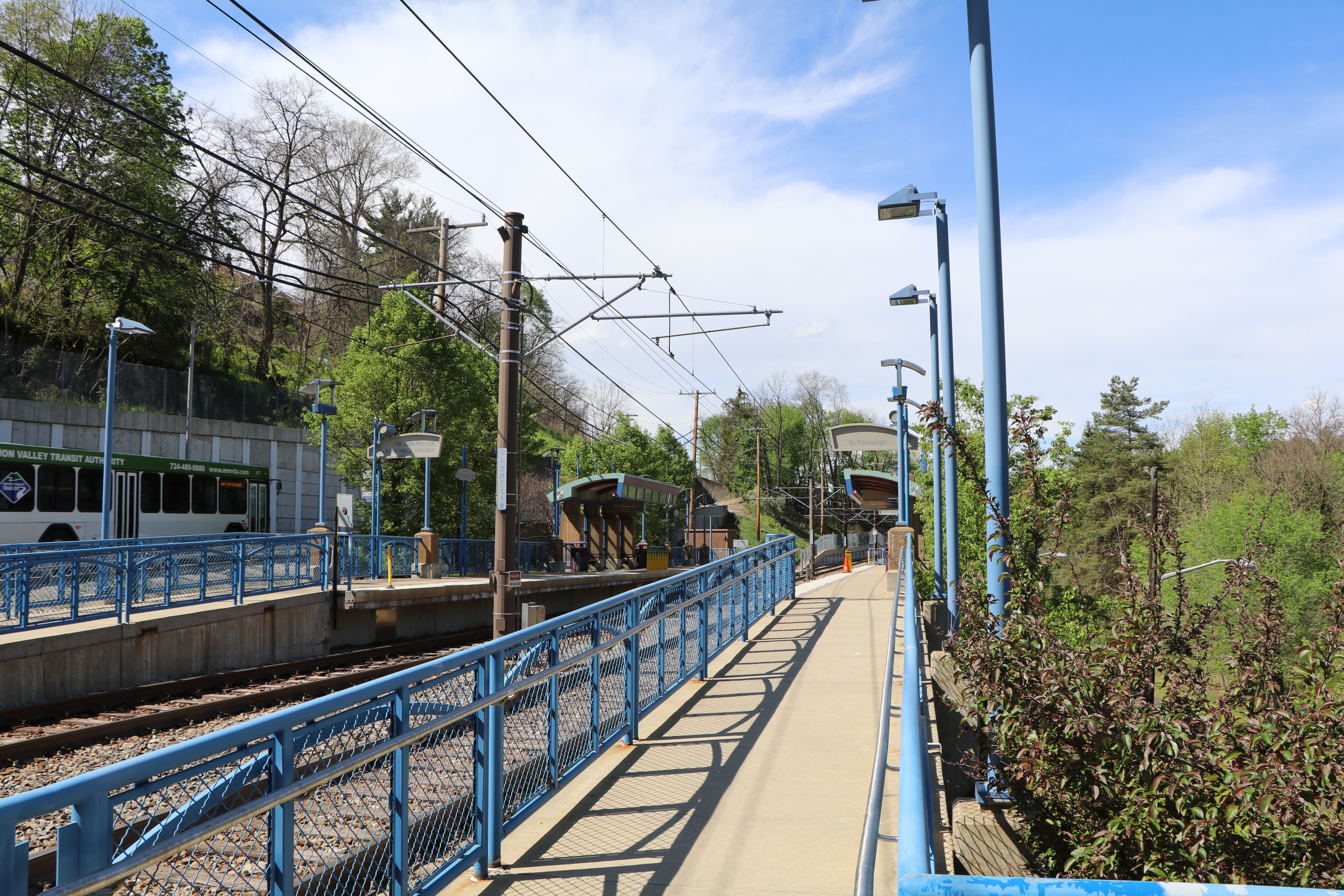
- South Bank station light rail platforms, April 2017

General information
- Location: Saw Mill Run Boulevard and Midwood Avenue; Pittsburgh, Pennsylvania
- Coordinates: 40.3930°N 79.9983°W
- Owner: Pittsburgh Regional Transit
- Lines: Overbrook Line; South Busway
- Platforms: 2 side platforms (light rail); 2 side platforms (busway)
- Tracks: 2
- Bus routes: PRT: Y1 Y45 Y46 Y47 Y49

Construction
- Structure type: At-grade
- Accessible: Yes

History
- Opened: December 1977
- Rebuilt: 2004

Passengers
- 2018: 141 (weekday boardings)

Services
Preceding station	Pittsburgh Regional Transit	Following station
Denise toward Allegheny	Blue Line	McNeilly toward South Hills Village
Denise toward Allegheny	Silver Line	McNeilly toward Library
Whited toward Station Square	South Busway	Central toward Glenbury
Former services
Preceding station	Port Authority of Allegheny County	Following station
Ansonia toward Gateway	47D Drake 1984–1993	Central toward Drake
Ansonia toward Gateway	47L Library via Overbrook	Central toward Library
Ansonia toward Gateway	47S South Hills Village via Overbrook	Central toward South Hills Village
Location

South Bank station is an at-grade combined light rail and busway station operated by Pittsburgh Regional Transit in the Overbrook neighborhood of Pittsburgh, Pennsylvania. The station is located on an exclusive right-of-way shared by the Blue and Silver lines of the Pittsburgh Light Rail system, as well as South Busway routes Y1, Y45, Y46, Y47, and Y49. Separate platforms are provided for light rail vehicles and busway buses.

The light rail side of the station has two high-level side platforms for level boarding and is accessible.

The station is a major transit facility, but also designed to serve the crowded and mostly residential community that surrounds the site.

== History ==
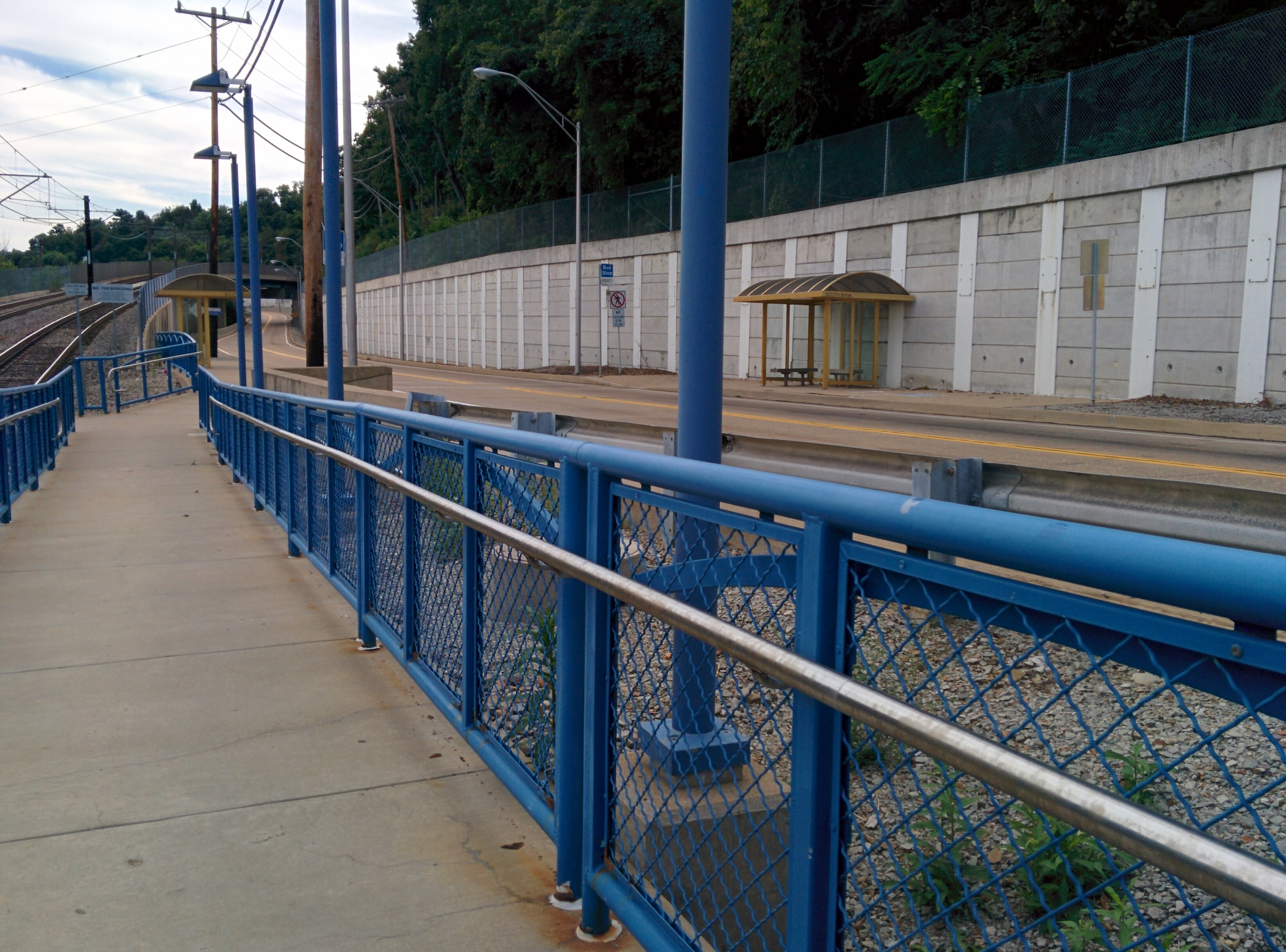
South Bank station busway platforms, September 2016

South Bank was opened in 1977, as a stop on the then-new South Busway, which served as the final connection point to the Overbrook line before reaching South Hills Junction, since the streetcar line left the busway at this point and crossed Route 51. In 1993, the Overbrook line was suspended, and the stop became a bus-only stop. Rail service returned when the Overbrook line was rebuilt in 2004, and was the only stop on the once shared portion of the busway to return as a rail-busway connection point.
