= Overbrook, Pennsylvania =

Overbrook, Pennsylvania may refer to:

- Overbrook (Pittsburgh)
- Overbrook, Philadelphia
