= Killarney station =

Killarney station could refer to:

- Killarney Station, a pastoral lease in Australia
- Killarney station (PAAC), a light rail station in Pittsburgh, Pennsylvania
- Killarney railway station, a railway station in Killarney, Ireland
