= South Hills Junction station =

South Hills Junction
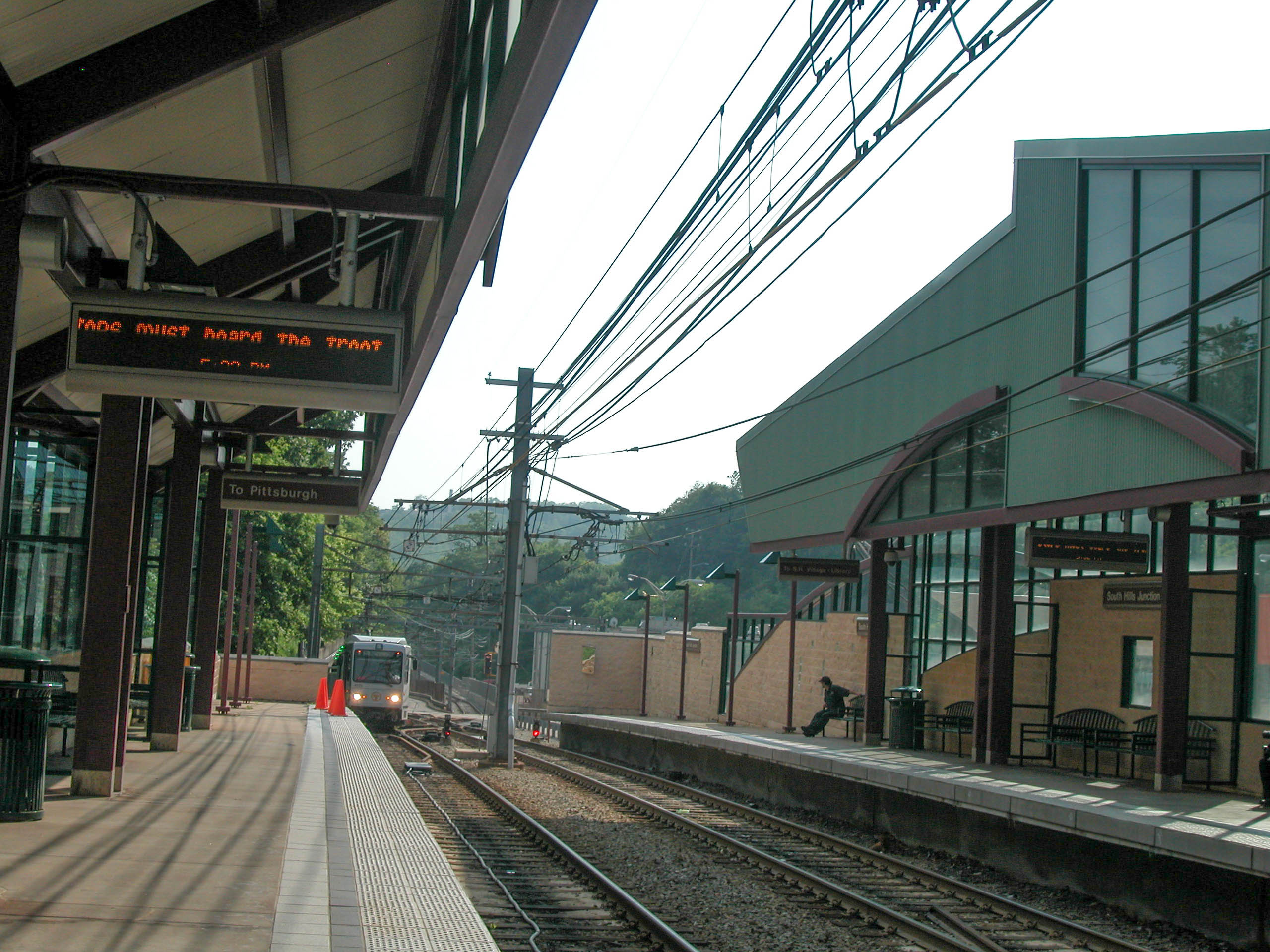
- South Hills Junction station light rail platforms, looking south, June 2005

General information
- Location: Warrington Avenue at Boggston Avenue; Pittsburgh, Pennsylvania
- Coordinates: 40.4209°N 80.0073°W
- Owner: Pittsburgh Regional Transit
- Platforms: 2 side platforms (light rail); 2 side platforms (busway)
- Tracks: 2
- Bus routes: PRT: 39, 40, 41, Y1 Y45 Y46 Y47 Y49
- Connections: PRT: 43, 44, 48, 51L, 54; Freedom Transit: Metro Commuter

Construction
- Structure type: At-grade
- Accessible: Yes

History
- Opened: December 4, 1904

Passengers
- 2018: 668 (weekday boardings)

Services
Preceding station	Pittsburgh Regional Transit	Following station
Station Square toward Allegheny	Blue Line	Boggs toward South Hills Village
Station Square toward Allegheny	Red Line	Palm Garden toward South Hills Village
Station Square toward Allegheny	Silver Line	Boggs toward Library
Station Square Terminus	South Busway	Palm Garden toward Glenbury or Dawn
Former services
Preceding station	Port Authority of Allegheny County	Following station
Harwood Steps toward Gateway	Brown Line	Terminus
Station Square toward Gateway	47D Drake 1984–1993	Boggs toward Drake
Location

South Hills Junction station is an at-grade combined light rail and busway station operated by Pittsburgh Regional Transit in the Mount Washington neighborhood of Pittsburgh, Pennsylvania. The station is located on an exclusive right-of-way shared by the Blue, Red, and Silver lines of the Pittsburgh Light Rail system, as well as South Busway routes 39, 40, 41, Y1, Y45, Y46, Y47, and Y49. Separate platforms are provided for light rail vehicles and busway buses. The station serves primarily as a major transit center, with limited access to nearby residential areas.

== History ==
The station and associated lines were originally established by the Pittsburgh Railways in 1904 following the completion of the Mount Washington Trolley Tunnel (now Mount Washington Transit Tunnel), with the first fare-paying passengers carried on December 4, 1904.

The station is situated at a complex "X-shaped" junction connecting the Mount Washington Transit Tunnel to the northwest, the Allentown Line (Brown) to the northeast, the Beechview Line (Red) to the southwest, and the Overbrook Line (Blue and Silver) to the southeast. Historically, platforms were provided on the Allentown, Beechview, and Overbrook branches. Since 2011, however, the Allentown line has seen only limited use, primarily during tunnel closures.

The connection to the Overbrook Line was closed in 1993 for reconstruction and was not restored, as the segment between South Hills Junction and Boggs station was determined to be too narrow for modern light rail vehicles. Two broad-curved ramps to the Overbrook Line was built south of South Hills Junction. The former Overbrook Line platforms at South Hills Junction remain in place but have been unused since 1993.
