= Former Overbrook Municipal Building =

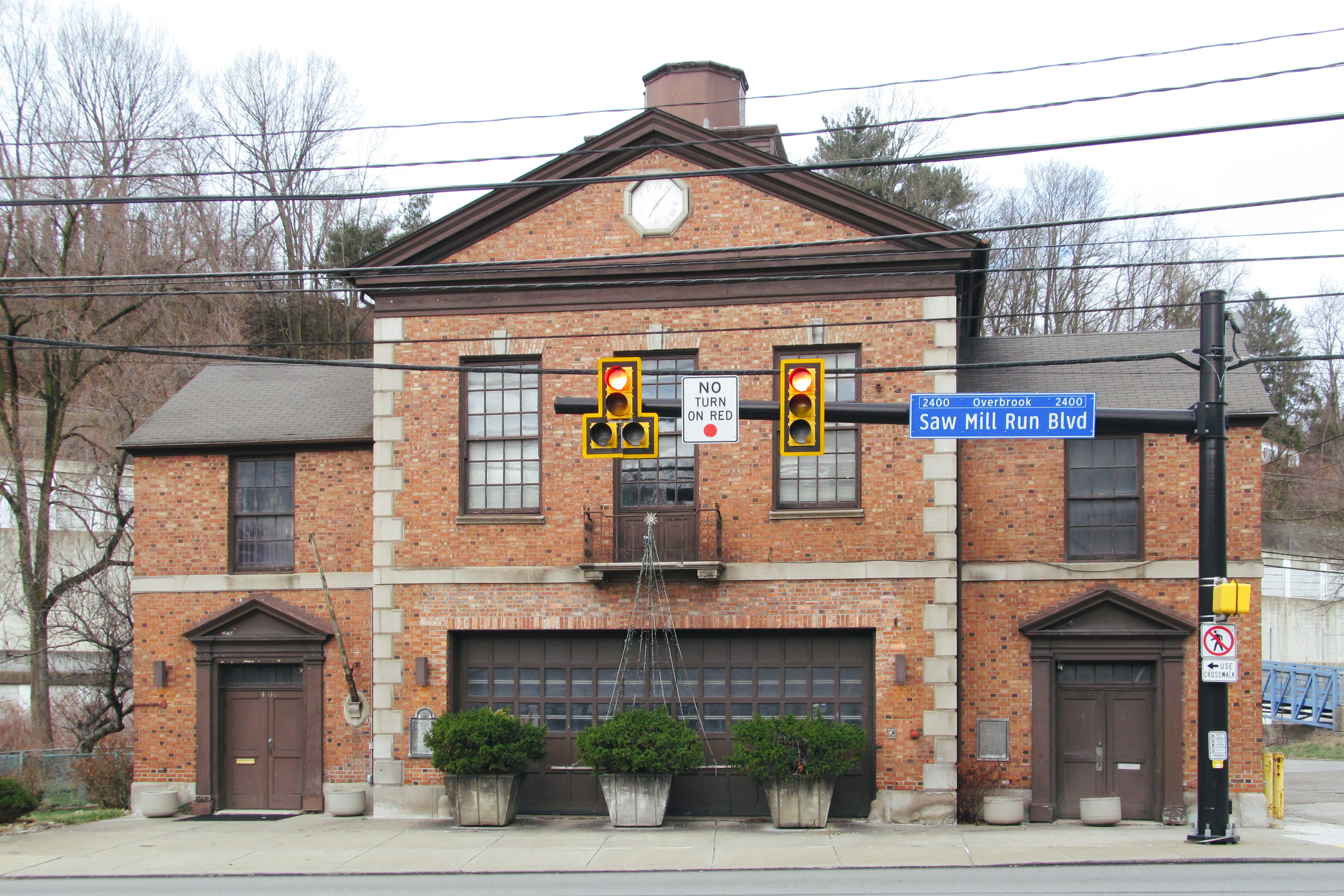
- The building in 2025

- Location within Pittsburgh
- 40°23′5.32″N 79°59′42.99″W
- Location: 2410 Saw Mill Run Boulevard (Overbrook (Pittsburgh)), Pittsburgh, Pennsylvania, USA

History
- Built: 1927-28

Site notes
- Architect: Louis Stevens
- Governing body: City of Pittsburgh

The former Overbrook Municipal Building is located at 2410 Saw Mill Run Boulevard in the Overbrook neighborhood of Pittsburgh, Pennsylvania. The building was designed by architect Louis Stevens in the Colonial Revival style and was built in 1927-28.

== History ==
The Borough of Overbrook separated from Baldwin Township and became independent in 1919. Not long after that, in 1927, the idea for a municipal building arose. The construction for the building was completed in 1929 and was met with impressive celebrations in the community. The borough invited 240 organizations to participate in a parade celebrating the finished building and people lined the streets to watch. The building originally served as home to the Borough Council and offices, as well as the municipal police forces and fire department. This use was short lived though, as in 1929 the residents of Overbrook voted in favor of being annexed into the City of Pittsburgh. After the annexation the building continued to serve the community as a firehouse. Renovations occurred and from 1930 to 1999 it became Engine Company No. 59. Following decommission the building was renamed the Accamando Center, and it serves as a community and recreation center maintained and owned by the City of Pittsburgh. The building was nominated in 2017 to become a City Historic Landmark by Preservation Pittsburgh.

== Architecture ==
The former Overbrook Municipal Building was designed by renowned Pittsburgh architect Louis Stevens, known mainly for his residential work in and around the city. The building was designed mainly in the Colonial Revival style, and is made of masonry and stone. The primary façade is divided into three symmetrical bays. The central bay is the largest and is two stories. The first story is notable for its sizable wooden paneled garage door, and the second story has two symmetrical windows to the left and right of a door with a small stone balcony. The left and right bays are identical to one another, each containing a framed doorway on the first floor, and a window on the second floor. This front façade symmetry was one of the typical design elements in the Colonial Revival style. The Colonial Revival style was commonly used for public buildings such as government offices, post offices, libraries, schools, banks, and churches. Despite this, other examples of this architectural style are relatively rare within the City of Pittsburgh.
