= Boggs station =

Boggs
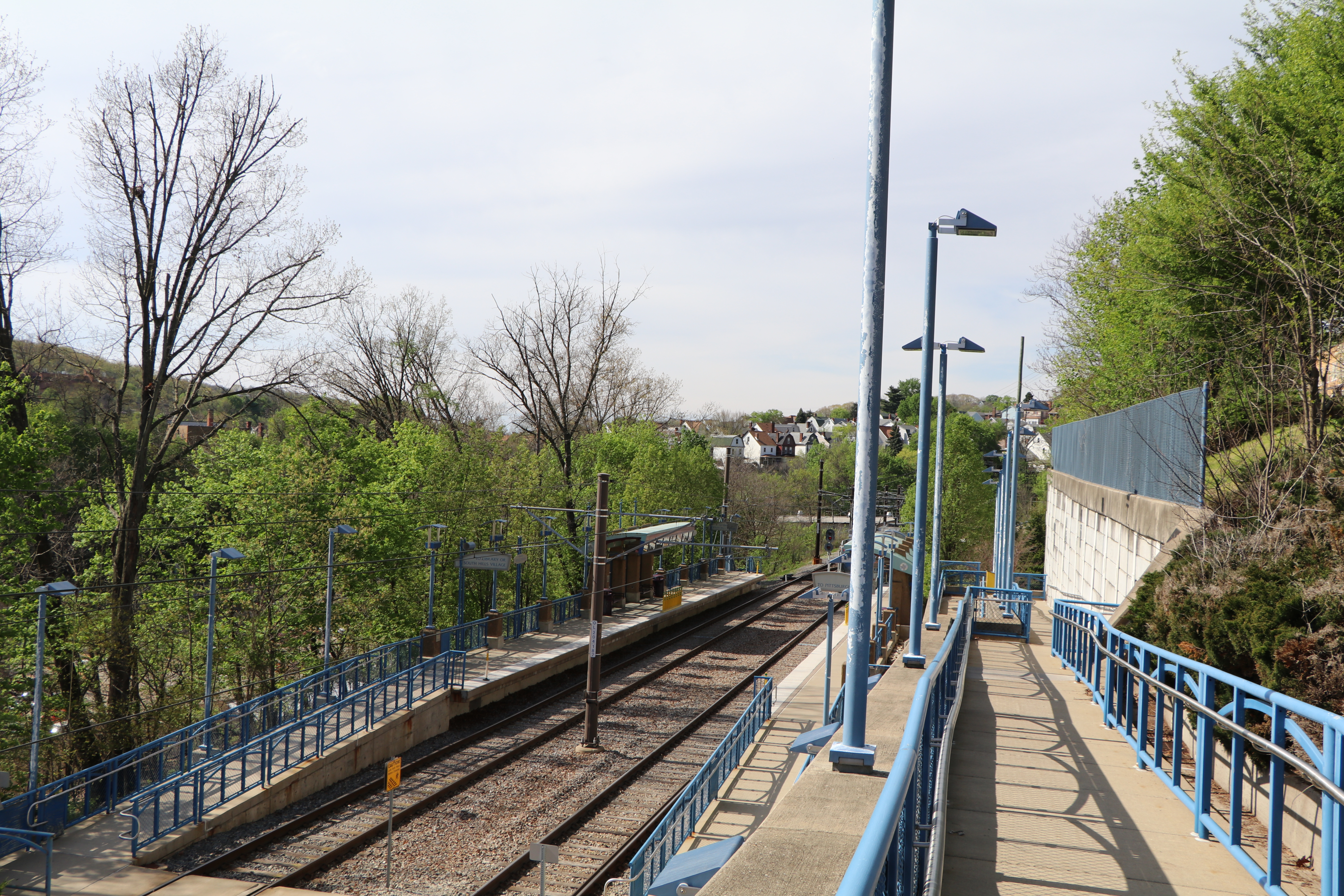
- Boggs station, looking north, with the northbound platform on the right, April 2017

General information
- Location: Boggston Avenue and Sylvania Avenue; Pittsburgh, Pennsylvania
- Coordinates: 40.4161°N 80.0102°W
- Owner: Pittsburgh Regional Transit
- Line: Overbrook Line
- Platforms: 2 side platforms
- Tracks: 2

Construction
- Structure type: At-grade
- Accessible: Yes

History
- Rebuilt: 2004

Passengers
- 2018: 37 (weekday boardings)

Services
Preceding station	Pittsburgh Regional Transit	Following station
South Hills Junction toward Allegheny	Blue Line	Bon Air toward South Hills Village
South Hills Junction toward Allegheny	Silver Line	Bon Air toward Library
Former services
Preceding station	Port Authority of Allegheny County	Following station
South Hills Junction toward Gateway	47D Drake 1984–1993	Morse Steps toward Drake
South Hills Junction toward Gateway	47L Library via Overbrook	Morse Steps toward Library
South Hills Junction toward Gateway	47S South Hills Village via Overbrook	Morse Steps toward South Hills Village
Location

Boggs station is a station on the Pittsburgh Light Rail network, operated by Pittsburgh Regional Transit, serving the Beltzhoover neighborhood in Pittsburgh, Pennsylvania. It has two high-level side platforms for level boarding and is accessible. The station that exits onto Boggston Avenue and Sylvania Avenue. The station serves commuters from the hilly, residential neighborhood.

== History ==
Boggs station opened on June 2, 2004, one of eight new platform equipped stations which replaced thirty-three streetcar style stops along the Overbrook branch.
