= Palm Garden station =

Palm Garden
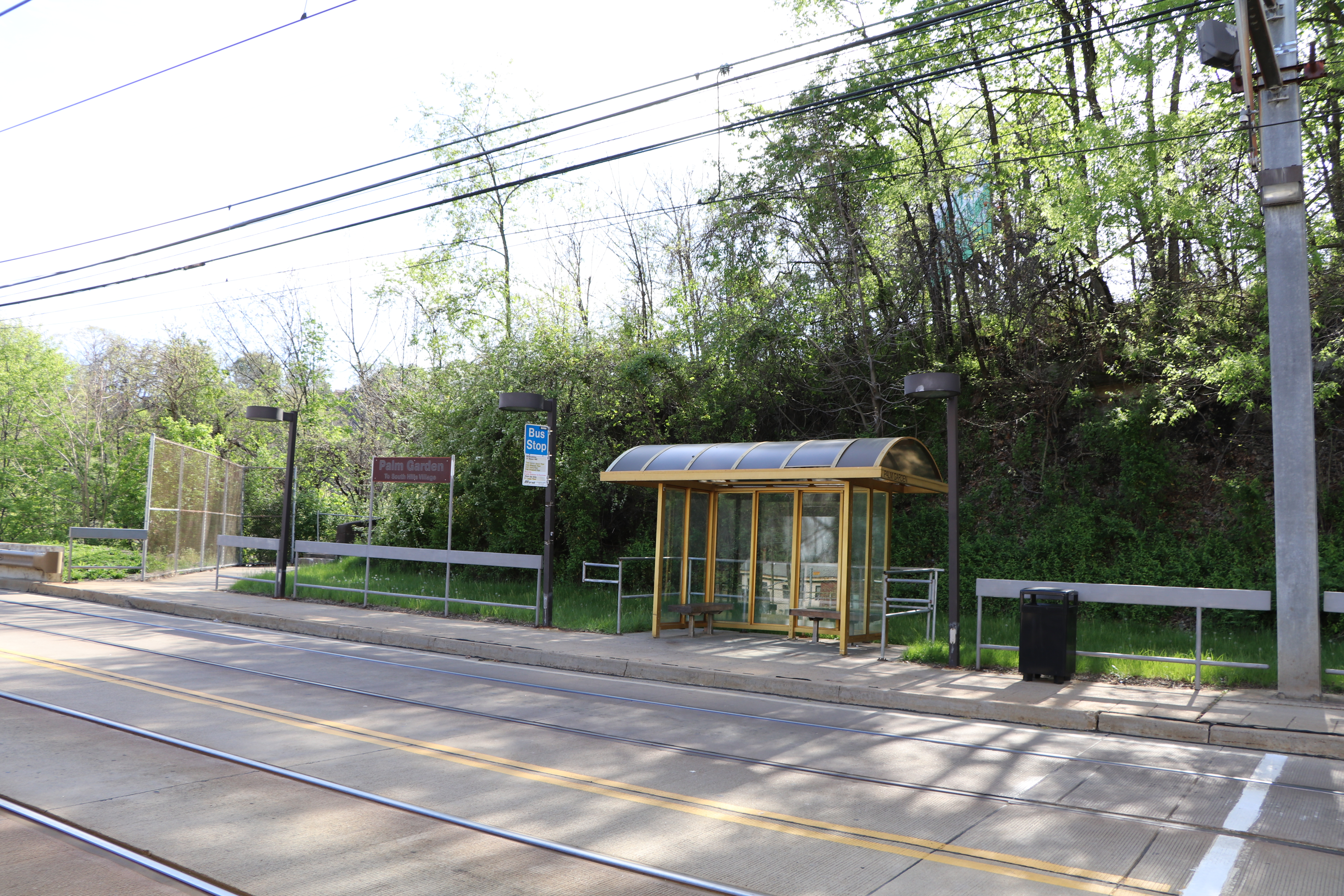
- Outbound platform at Palm Garden station

General information
- Location: South Busway at Boggs Avenue; Pittsburgh, Pennsylvania
- Coordinates: 40°24′58″N 80°00′42″W
- Owner: Pittsburgh Regional Transit (PRT)
- Platforms: 2 side platforms
- Tracks: 2
- Connections: PRT: 40, 43, 44

Construction
- Accessible: Buses only, rail under construction

History
- Opened: 1937
- Rebuilt: 1987

Passengers
- 2019: 202 (weekday boardings)

Services
Preceding station	Pittsburgh Regional Transit	Following station
South Hills Junction toward Allegheny	Red Line	Dawn toward South Hills Village
South Hills Junction toward Station Square	South Busway	Pioneer toward Glenbury
South Hills Junction toward Station Square	South Busway W Liberty Ave Ramp	Dawn Terminus
Location

Palm Garden station is an at-grade combined light rail and busway station operated by Pittsburgh Regional Transit in the Mount Washington neighborhood of Pittsburgh, Pennsylvania. The station is located on an exclusive right-of-way shared by the Red Line of the Pittsburgh Light Rail and South Busway routes 39, 41, Y1, Y45, Y46, Y47 and Y49. The station provides access to residences along the back slope of Mount Washington and is named for the large Palm Garden Apartments complex, which is centered on the stop.

Just south of this station buses and trains cross an elevated viaduct, the Palm Garden Trestle, over Pennsylvania Route 51. South of the trestle, the viaduct splits along with the Red Line and South Busway. In this area, routes 39 and 41 return to mixed traffic on Pioneer Avenue and Liberty Avenue respectively.

== History ==
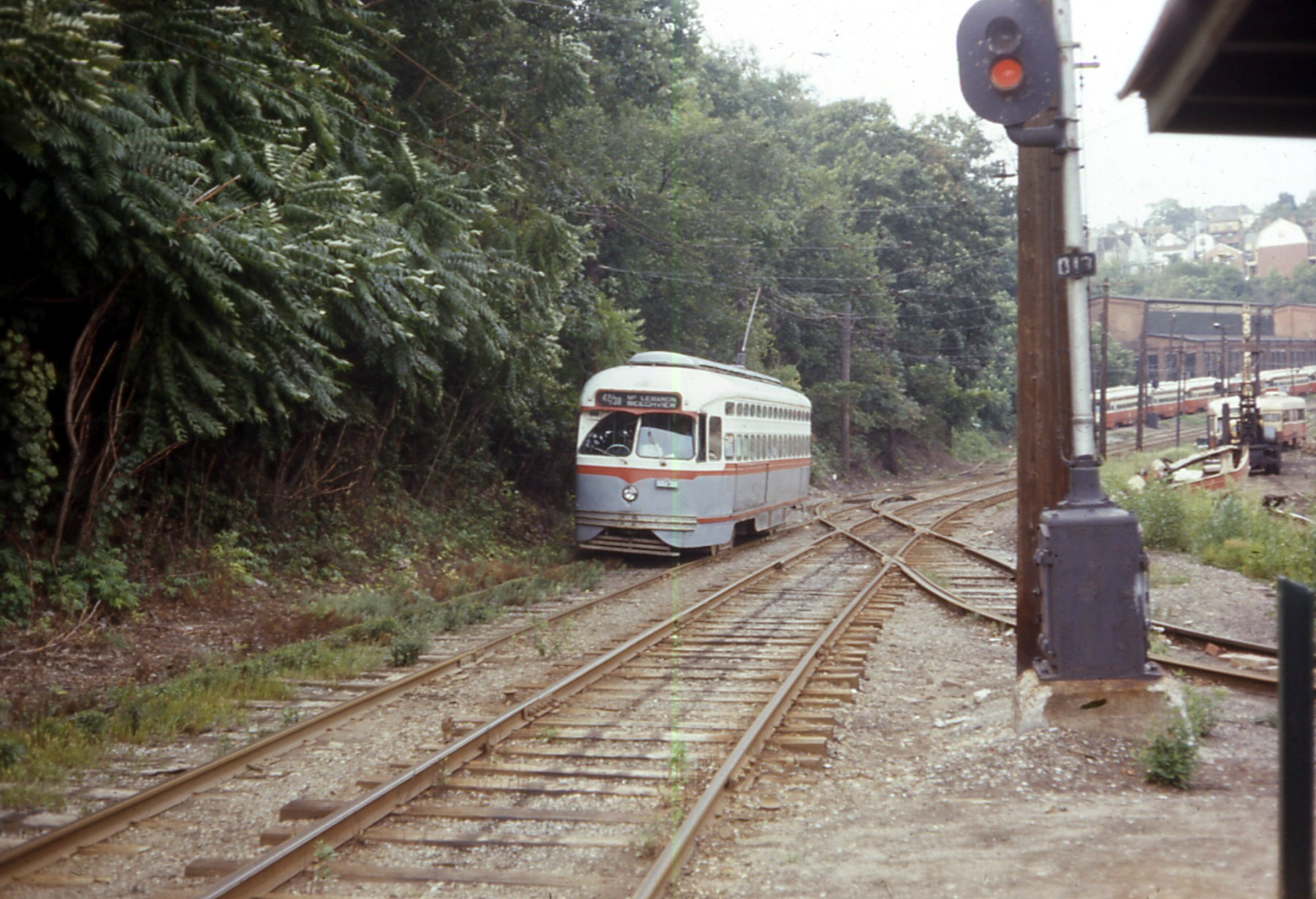
Palm Garden station in 1968

Palm Garden was originally a street-level stop at the northern end of the old Palm Garden Trestle. The private stop served the Palm Garden Apartments, opened in 1937. The trestle was replaced by a concrete mixed mode (light rail and bus) bridge, still referred to as the Palm Garden Trestle, which The T shares with the South Busway.

In May 2024, the Federal Transit Administration awarded Pittsburgh Regional Transit $8 million to construct accessible platforms at ten Red Line stops, including Palm Garden.
