= McNeilly station =

Light rail station in Pittsburgh, Pennsylvania, US

McNeilly
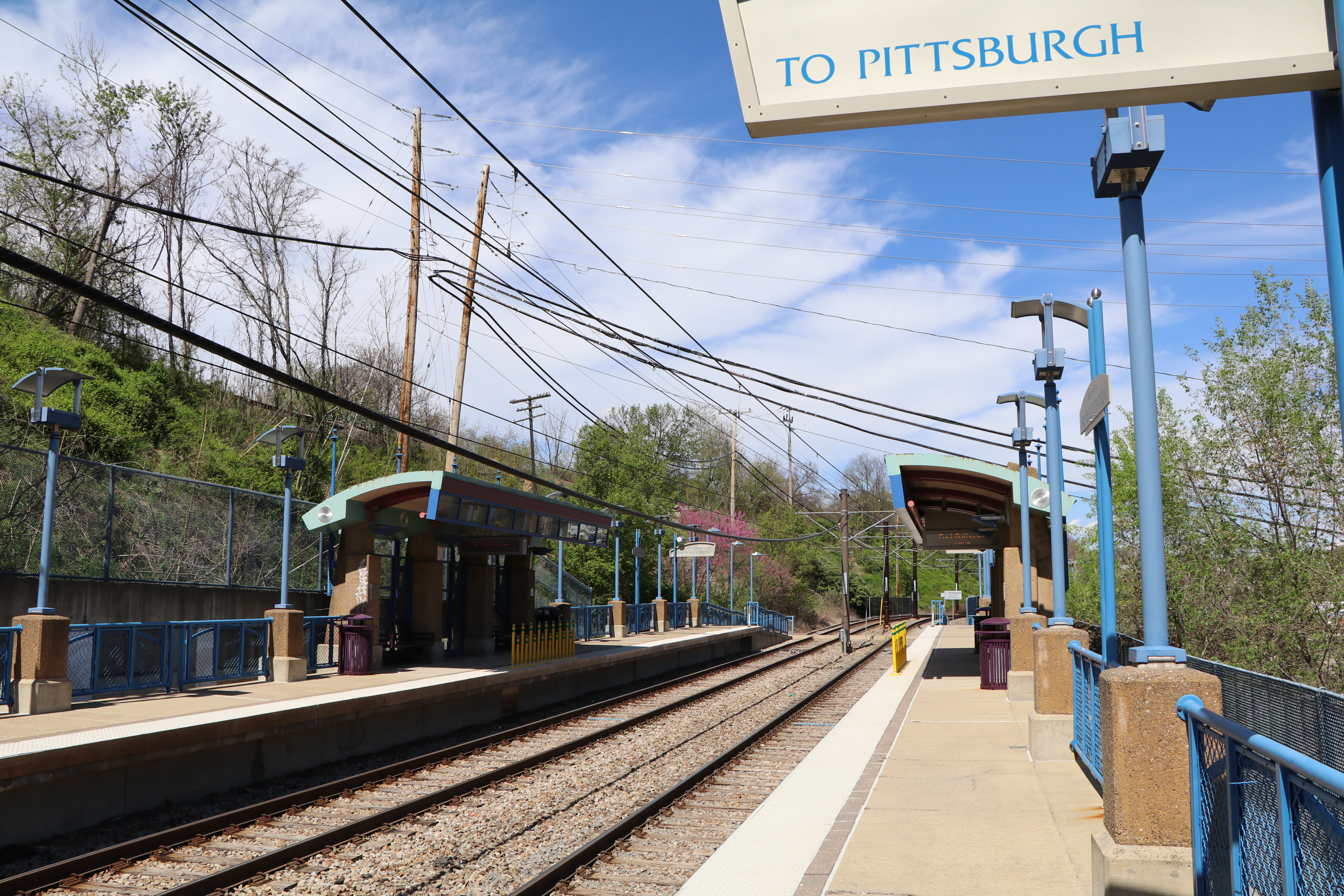
- McNeilly station platforms, April 2017

General information
- Location: Library Road and McNeilly Road; Baldwin Township, Pennsylvania
- Coordinates: 40.3777°N 80.0047°W
- Owner: Pittsburgh Regional Transit
- Line: Overbrook Line
- Platforms: 2 side platforms
- Tracks: 2

Construction
- Structure type: At-grade
- Accessible: Yes

History
- Opened: 1901
- Closed: 1993–2004
- Rebuilt: 2004

Passengers
- 2018: 102 (weekday boardings)

Services
Preceding station	Pittsburgh Regional Transit	Following station
South Bank toward Allegheny	Blue Line	Killarney toward South Hills Village
South Bank toward Allegheny	Silver Line	Killarney toward Library
Former services
Preceding station	Port Authority of Allegheny County	Following station
Paris toward Gateway	47D Drake 1984–1993	Spinning Wheels toward Drake
Paris toward Gateway	47L Library via Overbrook	Spinning Wheels toward Library
Paris toward Gateway	47S South Hills Village via Overbrook	Spinning Wheels toward South Hills Village
Location

McNeilly station is a station on the Pittsburgh Light Rail network, operated by Pittsburgh Regional Transit, serving Baldwin Township, Pennsylvania. It has two high-level side platforms for level boarding and is accessible. The station features no parking or connecting buses, but is located on a crowded strip of small businesses and many area residents are within walking distance of the station, providing easy access to Downtown.

== History ==
McNeilly station opened on June 2, 2004, one of eight new platform equipped stations which replaced 33 streetcar style stops along the Overbrook branch.
