= South Busway =

Busway in Pittsburgh, Pennsylvania

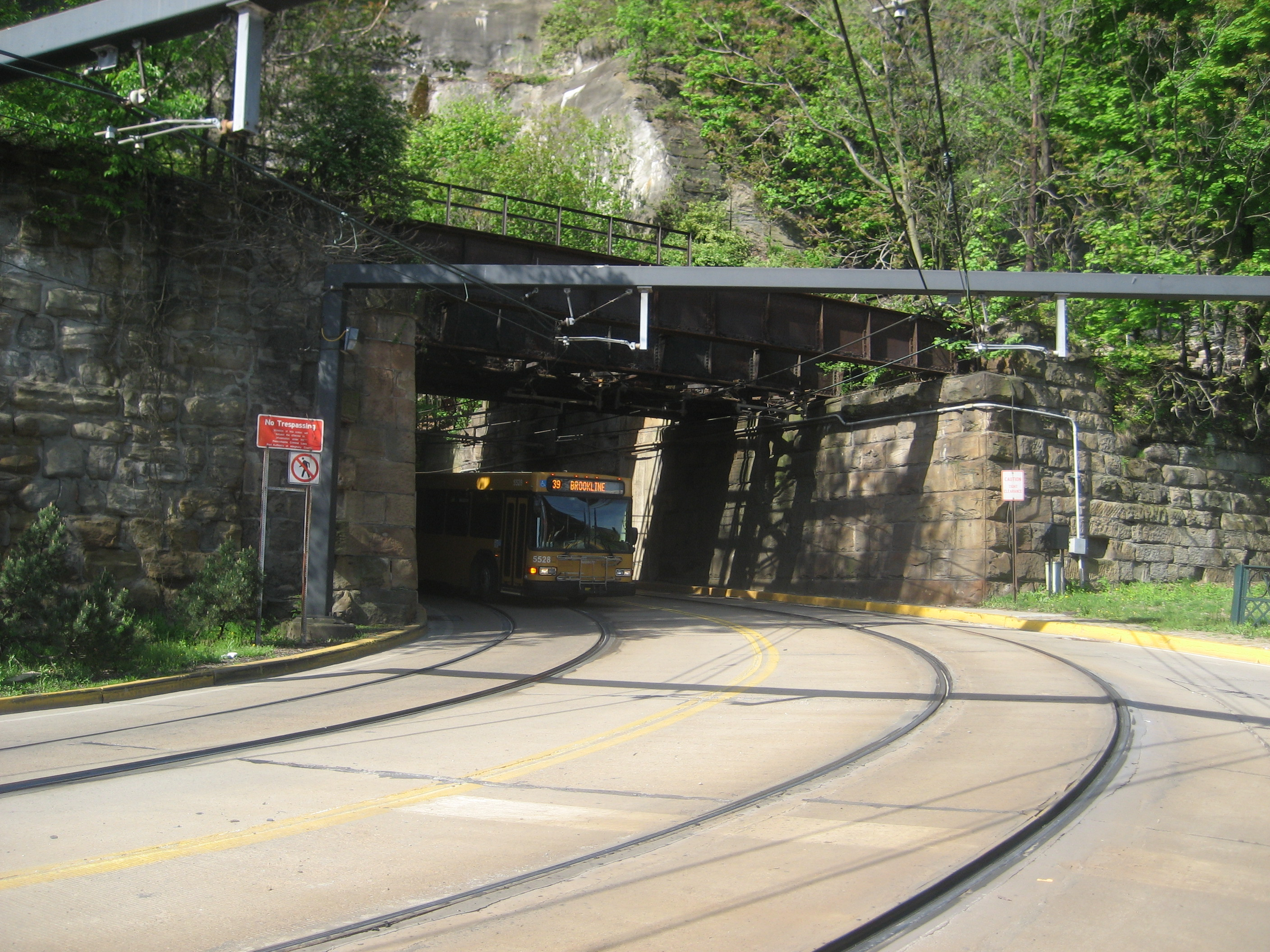
- Bus exiting the Mount Washington Transit Tunnel at the northern end of the South Busway

Overview
- Locale: Pittsburgh
- Termini: Station Square; Glenbury
- Stations: 12

Service
- Type: Bus rapid transit
- System: Pittsburgh Regional Transit

History
- Opened: December 1977

Technical
- Line length: 4.3 mi (6.9 km)
- Operating speed: 40 mph (64 km/h) (top)
Route map
South Busway highlighted in yellow

The South Busway is a two-lane bus rapid transit highway serving southern portions of the city of Pittsburgh. The busway runs for 4.3 miles (6.9 km) from the Mt. Washington Transit Tunnel across the Monongahela River from Downtown Pittsburgh to the Overbrook neighborhood of the city, bypassing the crowded Pennsylvania Route 51 (Saw Mill Run Boulevard). It is owned and maintained by Pittsburgh Regional Transit, the public transit provider for Allegheny County and the Pittsburgh region.

== Background ==
In the 1960s, the Port Authority began phasing out streetcar lines and replacing them with buses. The creation of a rail rapid transit system was also discussed, and one of the target routes was a corridor bordering Route 51 through the Brookline and Overbrook neighborhoods. While light rail would be developed during the following decade, the Port Authority decided to use the corridor to allows buses to avoid the crowded, narrow, and stop light-filled Route 51. In 1977, a two-lane route was constructed in a valley close to the road. Unlike later American busways, including the city's Martin Luther King Jr. East Busway (opened in 1983) and West Busway (opened in 2000), the route was not designed as a route in itself and does not feature the amenities associated with modern BRTs, such as branded buses, special stations, or other rail-like features. Instead, standard bus shelters are included and no routes terminate at the end of the busway. The main goal of the road is to allow for suburban buses to operate more quickly and to encourage the use of public transportation by allowing riders to avoid a highly congested highway. Following the naming convention of each busway being designated by a color, bus routes that use the South Busway begin with a "Y" for yellow.

The busway shared portions of its right of way with the city's light rail line. A section from the Glenbury to the South Bank stops was shared with the Overbrook line, and another section just after the Pioneer Avenue stop continues to share right of way from that point to South Hills Junction with the Beechview line. In 1993, the Overbrook line was suspended, and the right of way was exclusively busway. When the Overbrook line was rebuilt, it did not resume sharing the busway, rather, a new grade-separated private right of way was built parallel to the busway, with only the South Bank stop serving as the connection point between the rail line and busway.

The Institute for Transportation and Development Policy (ITDP), under its BRT Standard, has classified the South Busway as a "Basic BRT" corridor.

== Routes ==
Nine routes travel the busway. The Yellow colored "Y" routes serve the length of the busway, entering and exiting at its southern terminus at Glenbury station. Four local routes (39 Brookline, 40 Mt Washington, 41 Bower Hill, and 44 Knoxville) branch of off the busway to serve city neighborhoods. From north to south, all routes use the Mount Washington Transit Tunnel, Routes 40 and 44 enter and exit the busway at Warrington Avenue (just before Palm Garden station), route 41 enters and exits using a spur ramp to Liberty Avenue serving Dawn station before returning to city streets, and route 39 enters and exits at a ramp to Pioneer Avenue just before the Pioneer Station.

Route	Route Name	Destination	Service	Notes
39	Brookline	Brookline	Daily	
40	Mt. Washington	Duquesne Heights	Daily	
41	Bower Hill	Bridgeville	Daily	
44	Knoxville	St. Clair/Baldwin	Daily	
Y1	Large Flyer	Large to Forbes Ave/Smithfield St	Weekday peak	Follows same routing as Y46, but has stop restrictions and makes fewer stops on Route 51.
Y45	Baldwin Manor Flyer	South Park to Forbes Ave/Smithfield St	Weekday peak	
Y46	Elizabeth Flyer	Elizabeth to Wood Street	Daily	Select weekday trips serve Large Park and Ride.
Y47	Curry Flyer	CCAC South to Wood Street	Mon–Sat	Weekday trips extend to CCAC South.
Y49	Prospect Flyer	CCAC South to Wood Street	Daily	
Red	Red Line	Station Square to Dawn station	Daily	Light rail tracks are on the busway
Blue	Blue Line	Station Square, South Hills Junction, and South Bank station only	Daily	Light rail tracks are on the busway
Silver	Silver Line	Station Square, South Hills Junction, and South Bank station only	Daily	Light rail tracks are on the busway

== Stations ==
Station	Neighborhood	Routes	Notes
Station Square	South Shore	39 40 41 44 Y1 Y45 Y46 Y47 Y49	Pittsburgh Light Rail: Blue Red Silver; Monongahela Incline; Park and ride: 160 spaces
South Hills Junction	Mount Washington	39 40 41 44 Y1 Y45 Y46 Y47 Y49	Pittsburgh Light Rail: Blue Red Silver
Palm Garden	Mount Washington	39 41 44 Y1 Y45 Y46 Y47 Y49	Pittsburgh Light Rail: Red; 40 stops nearby on ramp to Warrington Av
Dawn	Beechview	41	Pittsburgh Light Rail: Red; Located on ramp to Liberty Avenue
Pioneer	Brookline	Y1 Y45 Y46 Y47 Y49	39 stops nearby on ramp to Pioneer Av
Edgebrook	Brookline	Y1 Y45 Y46 Y47 Y49	
Whited St	Brookline	Y1 Y45 Y46 Y47 Y49	
South Bank	Brookline	Y1 Y45 Y46 Y47 Y49	Pittsburgh Light Rail: Blue Silver
Central	Brookline	Y1 Y45 Y46 Y47 Y49	
Inglewood	Brookline	Y1 Y45 Y46 Y47 Y49	
Overbrook	Overbrook	Y1 Y45 Y46 Y47 Y49	
Glenbury	Overbrook	Y1 Y45 Y46 Y47 Y49	Southern terminus of the busway.

== See also ==
- Martin Luther King Jr. East Busway
- West Busway
- Pittsburgh Light Rail
