= Killarney station (Pittsburgh) =

Killarney
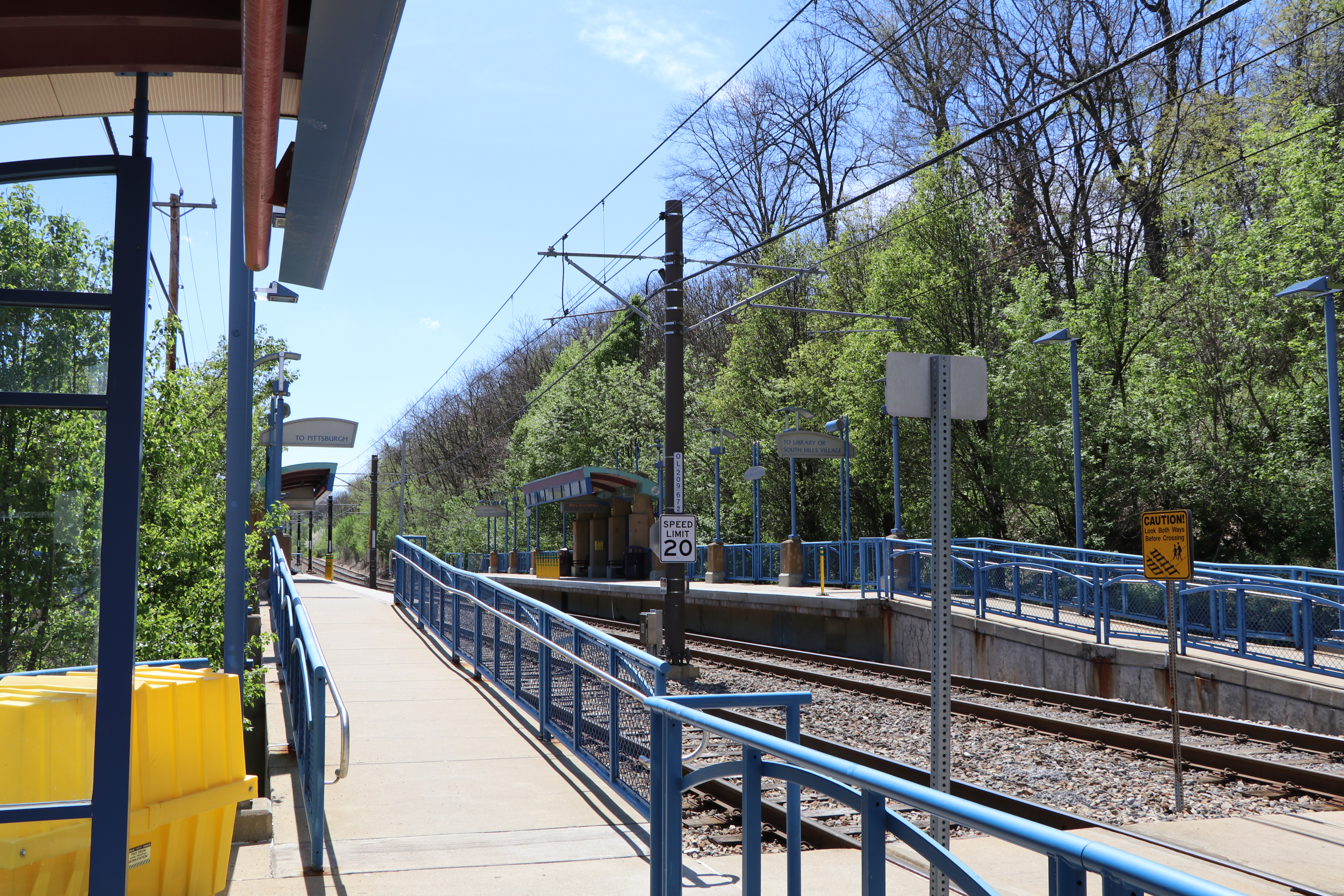
- Killarney station platforms, April 2017

General information
- Location: Library Road and Killarney Drive; Castle Shannon, Pennsylvania
- Coordinates: 40.3738°N 80.0079°W
- Owner: Pittsburgh Regional Transit
- Line: Overbrook Line
- Platforms: 2 side platforms
- Tracks: 2

Construction
- Structure type: At-grade
- Accessible: Yes

History
- Rebuilt: 2004

Passengers
- 2018: 169 (weekday boardings)

Services
Preceding station	Pittsburgh Regional Transit	Following station
McNeilly toward Allegheny	Blue Line	Memorial Hall toward South Hills Village
McNeilly toward Allegheny	Silver Line	Memorial Hall toward Library
Former services
Preceding station	Port Authority of Allegheny County	Following station
Spinning Wheels toward Gateway	47D Drake 1984–1993	Cooley toward Drake
Spinning Wheels toward Gateway	47L Library via Overbrook	Cooley toward Library
Spinning Wheels toward Gateway	47S South Hills Village via Overbrook	Cooley toward South Hills Village
Location

Killarney station is a station on the Pittsburgh Light Rail network, operated by Pittsburgh Regional Transit, serving Castle Shannon, Pennsylvania. It has two high-level side platforms for level boarding and is accessible. The station features no parking and connecting buses, but is located in a dense residential neighborhood.
