= Overbrook (Pittsburgh) =

- Neighborhood of Pittsburgh; Former Borough
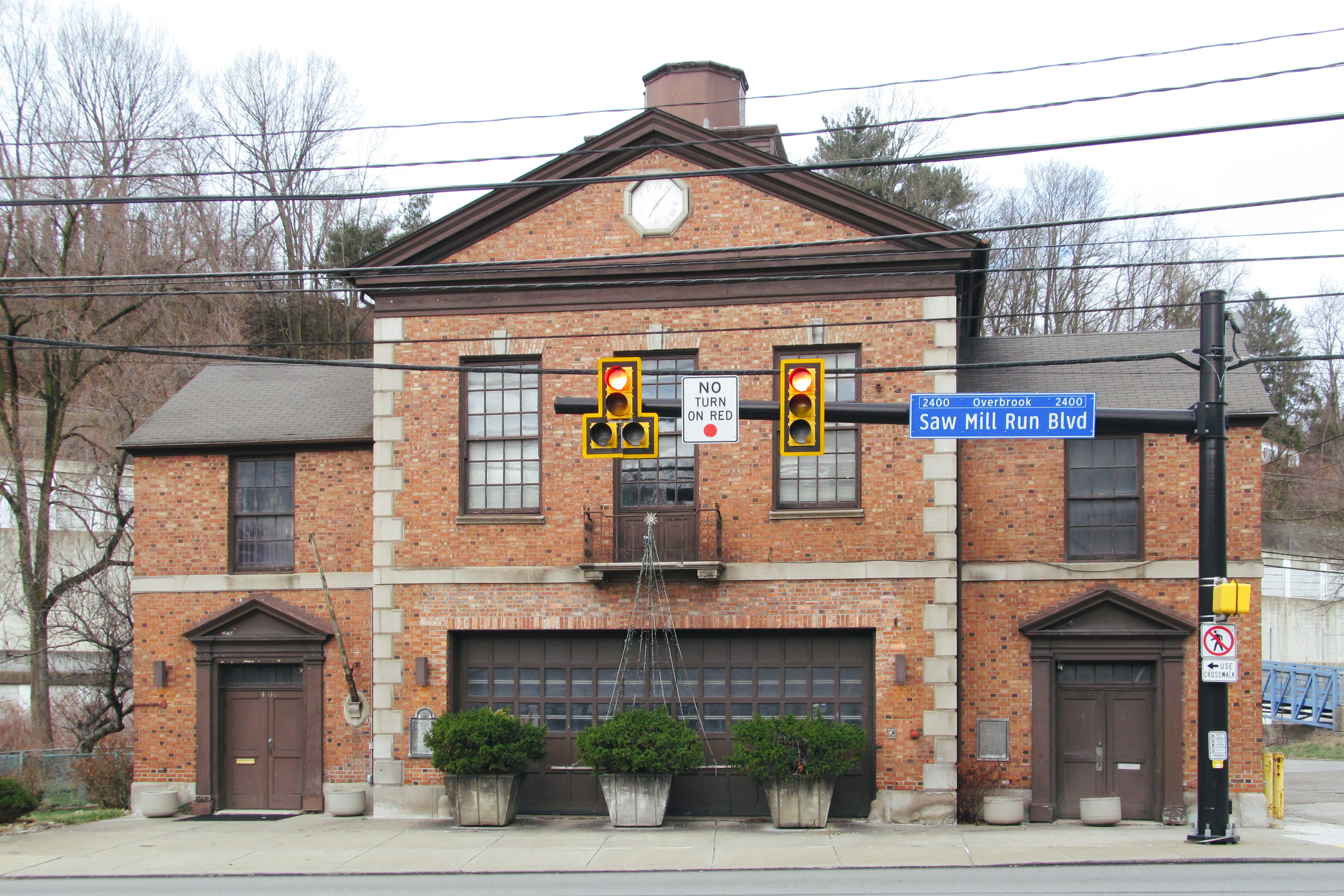
- Former Overbrook Municipal Building from the neighborhood’s time as an independent borough

- Coordinates: 40.385°N 79.993°W
- Country: United States
- State: Pennsylvania
- County: Allegheny County
- City: Pittsburgh

Area
  - Total: 0.839 sq mi (2.17 km^{2})

Population (2010)
  - Total: 3,644
  - Density: 4,340/sq mi (1,680/km^{2})

Overbrook is a neighborhood on Pittsburgh, Pennsylvania's South Hills area. It has zip codes of 15227, 15234 and 15210 and has representation on Pittsburgh City Council by the council member for District 4 (South Neighborhoods). Originally called Fairhaven, the name was changed to Overbrook when breaking away from Baldwin Township to become a borough. Overbrook is located at the edge of the city, south of Downtown, and is surrounded by the city neighborhoods Brookline and Carrick and the boroughs of Castle Shannon and Whitehall. Overbrook Borough was one of the last annexed into the City of Pittsburgh. The historic Overbrook Community Center retains its borough origins and is still used by the community.

Overbrook is convenient to both Phillips and Brookline Parks, as well the Brownsville Road and Brookline Boulevard business districts. It is an easy trip on the South Busway to Downtown, Station Square, and South Hills Village mall with light rail and busway stations.

Overbrook has experienced an influx of young families with children in recent years. The Overbrook Center and ballfield provide recreation for youth.

== Surrounding neighborhoods ==
Overbrook has five borders, including the Pittsburgh neighborhoods of Brookline to the northwest and Carrick to the northeast, the boroughs of Whitehall to the south and Castle Shannon to the south-southwest, and the township of Baldwin to the southwest.

== See also ==
- List of Pittsburgh neighborhoods
