= MacCracken =

MacCracken is a surname. Notable people with the surname include:

- William P. MacCracken Jr. (1888–1969), the first US Assistant Secretary of Commerce for Aeronautics
- Calvin D. MacCracken (1919–1999), American inventor in energy storage technology and ice rink construction
- Edith Bolte MacCracken (1869–1946), American club woman and civic leader
- Frederick MacCracken, KCB, DSO (1859–1949), British Army officer
- Henry MacCracken (1840–1918), American educator
- Henry Noble MacCracken (1880–1970), American academic administrator, president of Vassar College, Poughkeepsie, New York
- John Henry MacCracken (1875–1948), American academic administrator president of Westminster College and Lafayette College
- Michael MacCracken (born 1942), chief scientist for climate change programs with the Climate Institute in Washington, D.C.
- Trip MacCracken (born 1974), currently the Director of Roster Management for the Jacksonville Jaguars

== See also ==
- MacCracken Hall, women's residence hall on Miami University's campus in Oxford, Ohio
- Jurney v. MacCracken, 294 U.S. 125 (1935), was a case in which the Supreme Court of the United States
- McCracken (disambiguation)
- McCrackin
