= Alonina longipes =

Scientific classification
- Kingdom: Animalia
- Phylum: Arthropoda
- Clade: Pancrustacea
- Class: Insecta
- Order: Lepidoptera
- Family: Sesiidae
- Genus: Alonina
- Species: A. longipes

Binomial name
- Alonina longipes (Holland, 1893)

Synonyms
- Cicinoscelis longipes Holland, 1893

Species of moth

Alonina longipes is a moth of the family Sesiidae. It is known from Gabon.
