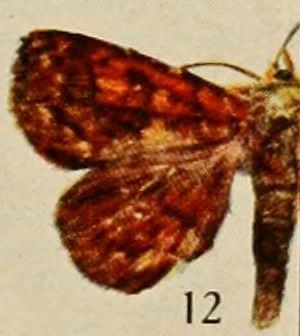

Scientific classification
- Kingdom: Animalia
- Phylum: Arthropoda
- Clade: Pancrustacea
- Class: Insecta
- Order: Lepidoptera
- Superfamily: Noctuoidea
- Family: Erebidae
- Genus: Phlogochroa
- Species: P. rubida

Binomial name
- Phlogochroa rubida (Holland, 1920)

Synonyms
- Heterospila rubida Holland, 1920

= Phlogochroa rubida =

Species of moth

Phlogochroa rubida is a moth of the family Noctuidae first described by William Jacob Holland in 1920. It is found in the Democratic Republic of the Congo.
