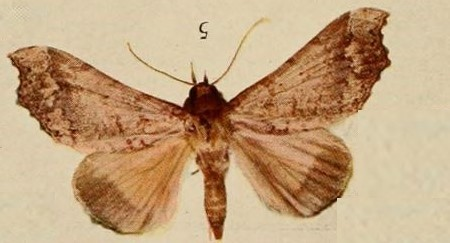

Scientific classification
- Kingdom: Animalia
- Phylum: Arthropoda
- Class: Insecta
- Order: Lepidoptera
- Superfamily: Noctuoidea
- Family: Erebidae
- Genus: Pseudogiria
- Species: P. variabilis

Binomial name
- Pseudogiria variabilis (Holland, 1920)

Synonyms
- Pseudogonitis variabilis Holland, 1920

= Pseudogiria variabilis =

Species of moth

Pseudogiria variabilis is a moth of the family Erebidae first described by William Jacob Holland in 1920. It is found in Cameroon, the Democratic Republic of the Congo and Gabon.
