= Ugia umbrina =

Scientific classification
- Domain: Eukaryota
- Kingdom: Animalia
- Phylum: Arthropoda
- Class: Insecta
- Order: Lepidoptera
- Superfamily: Noctuoidea
- Family: Erebidae
- Genus: Ugia
- Species: U. umbrina

Binomial name
- Ugia umbrina (Holland, 1894)

Synonyms
- Heterospila umbrina Holland, 1894

Species of moth

Ugia umbrina is a species of moth in the family Erebidae. It is found in Gabon.
