= Calvin D. MacCracken =

American inventor

- Born: Calvin Dodd MacCracken; November 25, 1919; Poughkeepsie, New York, U.S.
- Died: November 10, 1999 (aged 79); Hanover, New Hampshire, U.S.
- Education: Princeton University; Massachusetts Institute of Technology
- Occupation: Inventor
- Spouses: Martha McCracken Howard (m. 1941, divorced) Mary Burnham (m. 1969)
- Parent(s): Henry Noble MacCracken; Marjorie Dodd
- Relatives: Henry MacCracken (grandfather)

Calvin Dodd MacCracken (November 25, 1919 – November 10, 1999) was an American inventor who made important contributions to energy storage technology and the construction of ice rinks.

== Early life ==
MacCracken was born in Poughkeepsie, New York, to Henry Noble MacCracken, a president of Vassar College, and Marjorie Dodd MacCracken.

Cal MacCracken entered Princeton University at age 16 and graduated in 1940. After briefly working with one of Thomas Edison's sons he attended the Massachusetts Institute of Technology, where he earned a degree in mechanical engineering.

From college, MacCracken went to work at General Electric Corporation, where he designed the first combustion chamber and throttled the first jet engine.

== Later life ==
In 1947, MacCracken left General Electric to found Jet Heat Inc. (now known as CALMAC Corp.) in Englewood, New Jersey. In the following 50 years as CEO of CALMAC, he produced over 250 inventions and had 80 patents.

MacCracken is best known for his work in energy storage and ice rinks. He developed the IceBank® energy storage system, a form of thermal energy storage used to cool buildings by making ice at night when electricity rates are less expensive. IceBank® energy storage functions like a battery for a building's air-conditioning system. IceBank® saves dramatically on the cost to cool buildings by reducing a building's on-peak use of electricity. The IceBank ice battery system uses standard cooling equipment plus an energy storage tank to shift all or a portion of a building's cooling needs to off-peak, nighttime hours. During off-peak hours, ice is made and stored inside IceBank energy storage tanks. The stored ice is then used to cool the building the next day. IceBank® offers a critical service to grid, since air-conditioning is the main culprit behind spikes in peak electrical demand. This on-peak reduction decreases the need to build new power plants or turn on expensive “peaker” power plants. Over 1GW of IceBank energy storage is used in over 4,000 installations in 60 countries for commercial buildings, schools, government buildings, hospitals, hotels and retail.

MacCracken also invented the IceMat ice rink. This ice rink system was placed at over 2,000 ice rinks worldwide, including the one at Rockefeller Center in New York City. IceMat creates uniform ice with dramatic reduction in pumping power. IceMat rolls out like a carpet and connects to a refrigeration unit for quick installation at both temporary and permanent ice rinks. This flexible design has since become the industry standard for ice rinks. MacCracken also invented the SunMat roll-out solar collectors, comfort controls for space suits used by the Apollo program, the JetHeet furnace, the AquaJet water powered sump pump, the KPad for burn victims, the HI-V high velocity furnace with flexible duct system for adding central heating and air conditioning to homes and the Roll-A-Grill hot dog cooker.

Another of MacCracken's inventions was the Alumazorb low-emissivity ceiling that dramatically reduces radiant heat loads from the warm ceiling to the cold ice below, reducing energy consumption for freezing ice by up to 30 percent.

MacCracken was so far head of his time, that on a “futuristic” 1953 T.V show entitled 2000 A.D., he correctly predicted, in detail, the coming of the Solar Age. In 1955, MacCracken attended the first Solar Energy Convention in Arizona.

On November 10, 1999, MacCracken died of pneumonia at a retirement community in New Hampshire.

== Achievements ==
MacCracken was an 11-time national squash champion and local councilman. In the 1960s, he appeared in TV commercials for Ballantine Ale that were run by the P. Ballantine and Sons Brewing Company. Author of the book "A Handbook for Inventors", MacCracken was responsible for 80 patents.

MacCracken was honored for his contributions to ice sports through posthumous receipt of the Ice Skating Institute’s Frank J. Zamboni Award. He was an inaugural inductee into the New Jersey Inventors Hall of Fame and was inducted in the ASHRAE Hall of Fame in 2016, for his contributions to the growth of ASHRAE. (Interestingly, MacCracken's grandfather Henry M. MacCracken originally coined the term "Hall of Fame")

Today his son, Mark M. MacCracken continues in his father's legacy as CEO of CALMAC. CALMAC Corp. boasts over 1GW of energy storage and 2000 ice rinks have been installed in 60 countries.
