= Rhabdomantis =

Scientific classification
- Kingdom: Animalia
- Phylum: Arthropoda
- Class: Insecta
- Order: Lepidoptera
- Family: Hesperiidae
- Tribe: Erionotini
- Genus: Rhabdomantis; Holland, 1896

Genus of butterflies

Rhabdomantis is a genus of skipper butterflies in the family Hesperiidae.

== Species ==
- Rhabdomantis galatia (Hewitson, 1868)
- Rhabdomantis sosia (Mabille, 1891)
