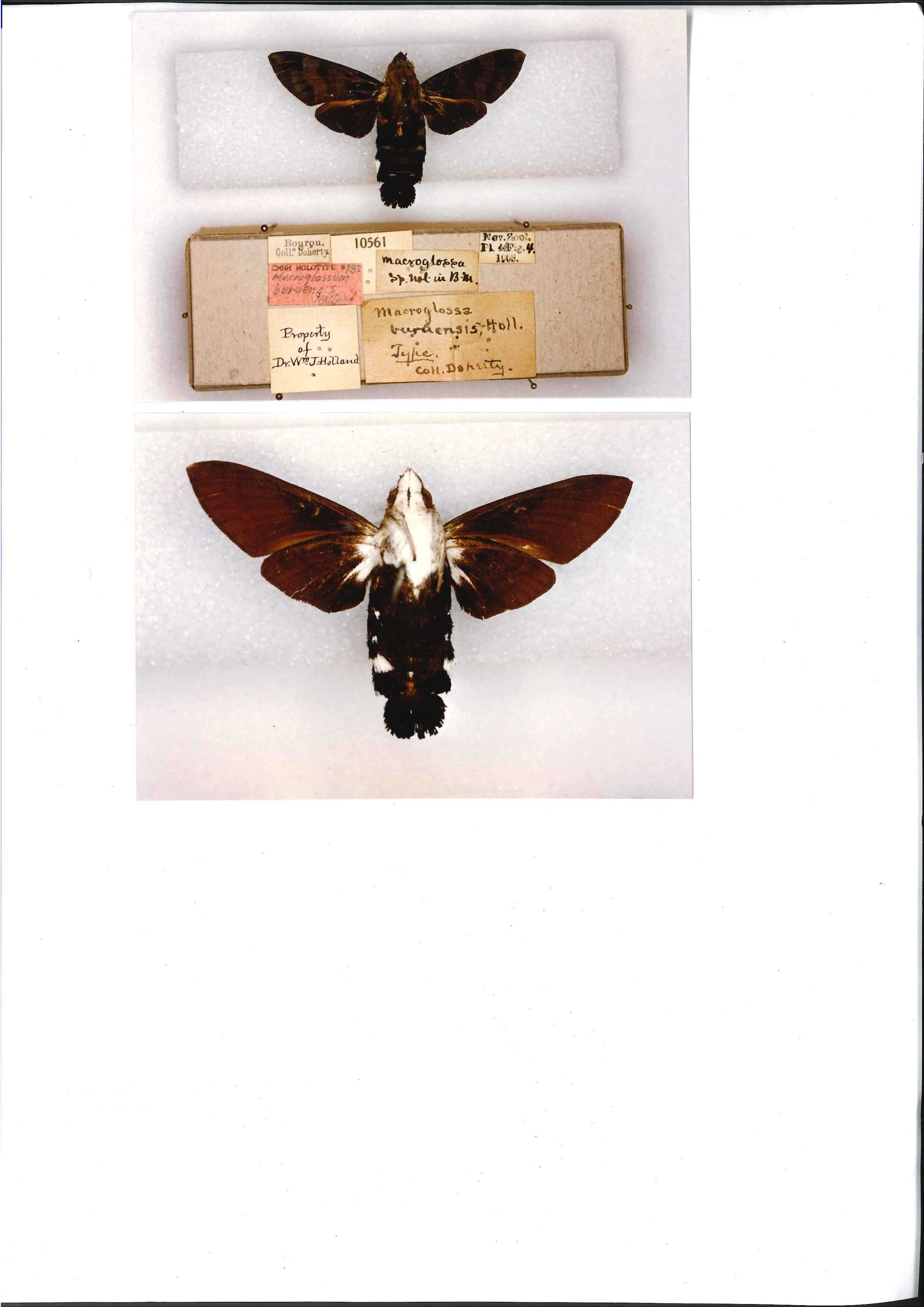

Scientific classification
- Kingdom: Animalia
- Phylum: Arthropoda
- Class: Insecta
- Order: Lepidoptera
- Family: Sphingidae
- Genus: Macroglossum
- Species: M. buruensis

Binomial name
- Macroglossum buruensis Holland, 1900

= Macroglossum buruensis =

Species of moth

Macroglossum buruensis is a moth of the family Sphingidae. It is known from Buru in Indonesia.

The abdomen upperside is black, with no side patches. The underside of the thorax is chalky white extending triangularly to the base of the third segment of the abdomen. The forewing upperside has bands which are not prominent but still distinct. The underside of both wings has a white base. The hindwing upperside is unicolorous.
