= McCracken =

McCracken may refer to:

== People ==
- McCracken (surname), people with the surname McCracken

== Places ==
- McCracken County, Kentucky, a county located in western Kentucky, USA
- McCracken, Kansas, a city in Rush County, Kansas, USA
- McCracken, Missouri, an unincorporated community, USA
- McCracken, Ohio, a road in Garfield Hts., Ohio, USA
- McCracken, South Australia, a suburb of Victor Harbor, Australia

== Other ==
- McCracken County Public Schools, a school district in the Kentucky county
  - McCracken County High School, a school operated by the above district
- USS McCracken (APA-198), a Haskell-class attack transport ship

== See also ==
- McCrackin (disambiguation)
