= Ugia taeniata =

Scientific classification
- Kingdom: Animalia
- Phylum: Arthropoda
- Clade: Pancrustacea
- Class: Insecta
- Order: Lepidoptera
- Superfamily: Noctuoidea
- Family: Erebidae
- Genus: Ugia
- Species: U. taeniata

Binomial name
- Ugia taeniata (Holland, 1894)

Synonyms
- Heterospila taeniata Holland, 1894

Species of moth

Ugia taeniata is a species of moth in the family Erebidae. It is found in Gabon and South Africa.
