= Alonina rygchiiformis =

Scientific classification
- Kingdom: Animalia
- Phylum: Arthropoda
- Class: Insecta
- Order: Lepidoptera
- Family: Sesiidae
- Genus: Alonina
- Species: A. rygchiiformis

Binomial name
- Alonina rygchiiformis Walker, 1856

Synonyms
- Alonina rhynchiiformis Hampson, 1919

Species of moth

Alonina rygchiiformis is a moth of the family Sesiidae. It is known from South Africa.
