= Gilbert Morgan =

American leader (1791–1875)

The Reverend Gilbert Morgan

2nd Principal of the Western University of Pennsylvania
- In office 1835–1836
- Preceded by: Robert Bruce
- Succeeded by: Robert Bruce

Personal details
- Born: May 23, 1791 New York, U.S.
- Died: May 28, 1875 (aged 84) New York City, U.S.
- Education: Union College; Princeton University

The Rev. Gilbert Morgan (May 23, 1791 – May 28, 1875) is generally numbered as the second chancellor of the University of Pittsburgh, then called the Western University of Pennsylvania. He served only one year, from 1835 to 1836. His official title at the time was "Principal," a holdover from the institution's academy days.

== Biography ==
Born in New York on May 23, 1791, Morgan was a graduate of Union University in Schenectady, New York. He then completed theological studies at Princeton University.

Morgan was appointed as university president by the University Board of Trustees in July 1835 following recommendations from his associates at Union College. At the time of his appointment, he was also a Professor of Intellectual and Moral Philosophy, Sacred Literature and Oratory.

After beginning work on September 21, 1835, he was officially inaugurated on Tuesday evening, December 1, 1835. The ceremony was held at the First Presbyterian Church. He opened his inaugural address by saying:

"An oath to the Searcher of Hearts, administered by the Guardian of the Commonwealth, adds fear to this solemnity. This anticipation of the eternal results, summons the conscience to trace the bearings of this office. They cannot be limited to Pupils, to the City, or State. The history of Pennsylvania, the history of our country is the record of but few individuals. It is three centuries since a smaller city than Pittsburgh, secluded among the Alps, on less ambitious waters, received a stranger seeking the retirement of learning. He furnished the model for European and American Colleges. The principles which preserve the State free, and the Church pure, the one dissevered from the other, leaving each to govern and reform themselves first took their visible forms in the Academy of Geneva. That Academy, with its distinguished head, gave the reformation and civil freedom to Holland, to Scotland; to England,—the best elements of reform; to France,—a bright morning, darkened by martyrdom and exile. But the cloud, which poured its rebuke on Europe, was the pillar of fire to the American Israel. The Moses' and Hurs, the Aarons and Joshuas, who led forth the colonies were educated in that school of Faith and Freedom. As in her own walls was educated Milton, strong in human rights; so Locke and Sidney."

His short tenure as president was considered mostly unsuccessful. He resigned just a year after his appointment to accept a position at a school for young women in North Carolina.

== Illness, death, funeral, and interment ==
Morgan fell ill with pneumonia in mid-May 1875 and died from that condition on May 18 while staying at the home of his son-in-law, the Honorable E. Delafield Smith, in New York City, New York. His funeral was held at his son-in-law's home on Monday, June 6; his body was then transported to New Jersey, where it was interred at the First Presbyterian Churchyard Cemetery in Shrewsbury.

Preceded by Robert Bruce	University of Pittsburgh Principal; 1835 – 1836	Succeeded by Robert Bruce (Heman Dyer was the third individual to occupy the post)
