= Ugia duplicata =

Scientific classification
- Domain: Eukaryota
- Kingdom: Animalia
- Phylum: Arthropoda
- Class: Insecta
- Order: Lepidoptera
- Superfamily: Noctuoidea
- Family: Erebidae
- Genus: Ugia
- Species: U. duplicata

Binomial name
- Ugia duplicata Gaede, 1940

Species of moth

Ugia duplicata is a species of moth in the family Erebidae. It was described by Max Gaede in 1940, without mentioning the collecting locality.
