= Ugia mediorufa =

Scientific classification
- Kingdom: Animalia
- Phylum: Arthropoda
- Class: Insecta
- Order: Lepidoptera
- Superfamily: Noctuoidea
- Family: Erebidae
- Genus: Ugia
- Species: U. mediorufa

Binomial name
- Ugia mediorufa (Hampson, 1894)

Synonyms
- Thermesia mediorufa Hampson, 1894

Species of moth

Ugia mediorufa is a species of moth in the family Erebidae. It is found in India (Naga).
