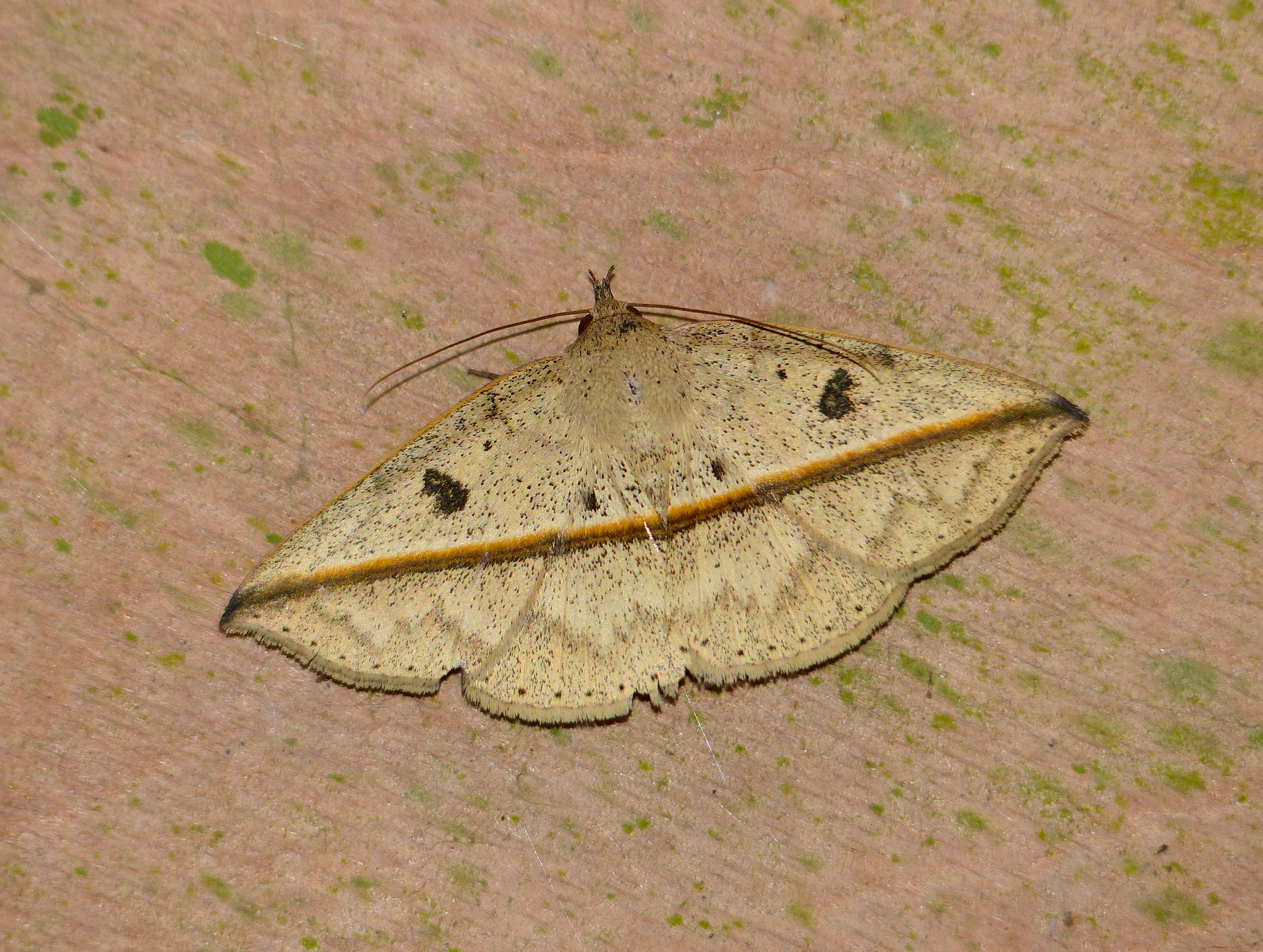

Scientific classification
- Kingdom: Animalia
- Phylum: Arthropoda
- Class: Insecta
- Order: Lepidoptera
- Superfamily: Noctuoidea
- Family: Erebidae
- Genus: Ugia
- Species: U. disjungens

Binomial name
- Ugia disjungens Walker, 1858

Synonyms
- Sarthida signifera Walker, 1863

= Ugia disjungens =

Species of moth

Ugia disjungens is a species of moth in the family Erebidae. It is found in Thailand, Malaysia and Singapore and on Borneo.
