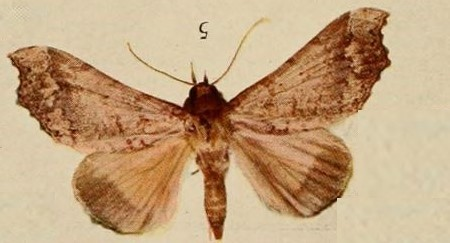
- Pseudogiria variabilis

Scientific classification
- Kingdom: Animalia
- Phylum: Arthropoda
- Clade: Pancrustacea
- Class: Insecta
- Order: Lepidoptera
- Superfamily: Noctuoidea
- Family: Erebidae
- Subfamily: Calpinae
- Genus: Pseudogiria; Berio, 1965

Synonyms
- Pteronycta Hampson, 1926

= Pseudogiria =

Genus of moths

Pseudogiria is a genus of moths of the family Erebidae. The genus was erected by Emilio Berio in 1965.

== Species ==
- Pseudogiria angulata (Bethune-Baker, 1909)
- Pseudogiria hypographa (Hampson, 1926)
- Pseudogiria polita Berio, 1965
- Pseudogiria variabilis (Holland, 1920)
