= Alonina =

Scientific classification
- Kingdom: Animalia
- Phylum: Arthropoda
- Class: Insecta
- Order: Lepidoptera
- Family: Sesiidae
- Subfamily: Sesiinae
- Genus: Alonina; Walker, 1856

Species
- See text

Genus of moths

Alonina is a genus of moths in the family Sesiidae.

== Species ==
- Alonina difformis Hampson, 1919
- Alonina longipes (Holland, 1893)
- Alonina rygchiiformis Walker, 1856
