= Ugia egcarsia =

Scientific classification
- Domain: Eukaryota
- Kingdom: Animalia
- Phylum: Arthropoda
- Class: Insecta
- Order: Lepidoptera
- Superfamily: Noctuoidea
- Family: Erebidae
- Genus: Ugia
- Species: U. egcarsia

Binomial name
- Ugia egcarsia (Bethune-Baker, 1911)

Synonyms
- Iluza egcarsia Bethune-Baker, 1911

Species of moth

Ugia egcarsia is a species of moth in the family Erebidae. It is found in Angola.
