= Ugia serrilinea =

Scientific classification
- Kingdom: Animalia
- Phylum: Arthropoda
- Class: Insecta
- Order: Lepidoptera
- Superfamily: Noctuoidea
- Family: Erebidae
- Genus: Ugia
- Species: U. serrilinea

Binomial name
- Ugia serrilinea Hampson, 1926

Species of moth

Ugia serrilinea is a species of moth in the family Erebidae. It is found on Borneo, Peninsular Malaysia and in Thailand and Indonesia (Sumatra, Sulawesi). The habitat consists of lowland forests, including heath forests.
