= Ugia mascusalis =

Scientific classification
- Kingdom: Animalia
- Phylum: Arthropoda
- Class: Insecta
- Order: Lepidoptera
- Superfamily: Noctuoidea
- Family: Erebidae
- Genus: Ugia
- Species: U. mascusalis

Binomial name
- Ugia mascusalis (Walker, 1859)

Synonyms
- Herminia mascusalis Walker, 1859

Species of moth

Ugia mascusalis is a species of moth in the family Erebidae. It is found in Sierra Leone.
