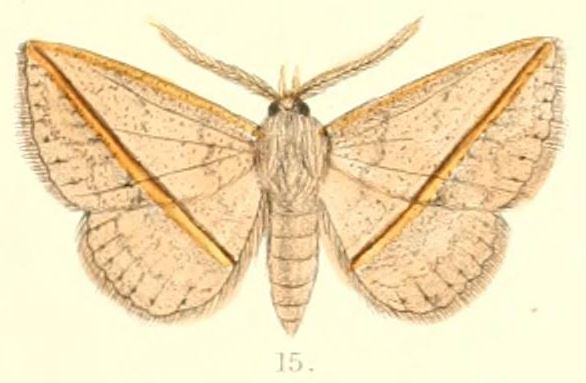

Scientific classification
- Domain: Eukaryota
- Kingdom: Animalia
- Phylum: Arthropoda
- Class: Insecta
- Order: Lepidoptera
- Superfamily: Noctuoidea
- Family: Erebidae
- Genus: Ugia
- Species: U. transversa

Binomial name
- Ugia transversa (Moore, 1882)

Synonyms
- Iluza transversa Moore, 1882

= Ugia transversa =

Species of moth

Ugia transversa is a species of moth in the family Erebidae first described by Frederic Moore in 1882. It is found from the north-eastern Himalayas to southern China.
