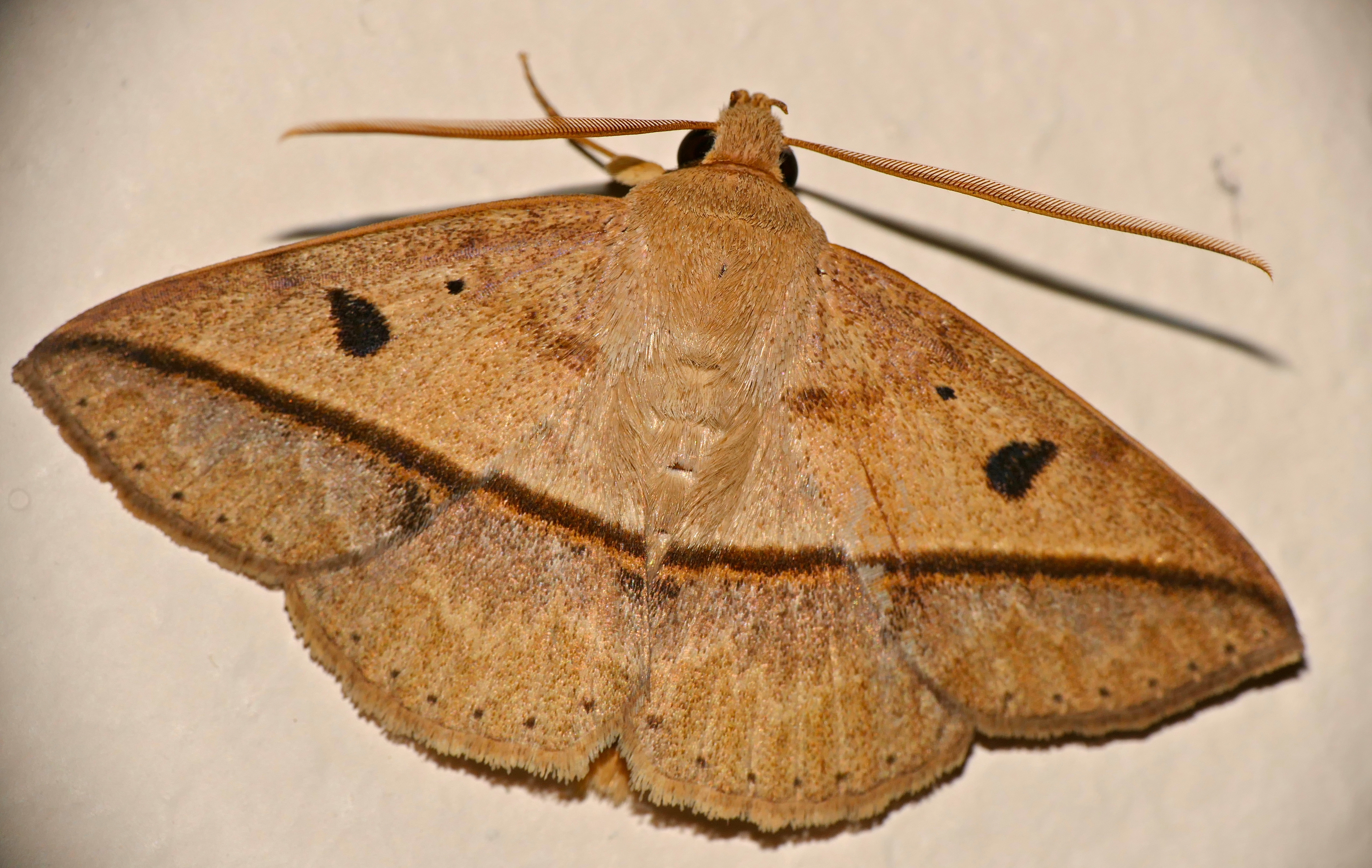

Scientific classification
- Kingdom: Animalia
- Phylum: Arthropoda
- Class: Insecta
- Order: Lepidoptera
- Superfamily: Noctuoidea
- Family: Erebidae
- Genus: Ugia
- Species: U. sundana

Binomial name
- Ugia sundana Hampson, 1924

Synonyms
- Ugia albertii Kobes, 1989

= Ugia sundana =

Species of moth

Ugia sundana is a species of moth in the family Erebidae. It is found in Indonesia (Java, Sumatra, Borneo) and in Thailand. The habitat consists of lowland forests.

The ground colour of the wings is medium reddish brown in males. Females are more ochreous.
