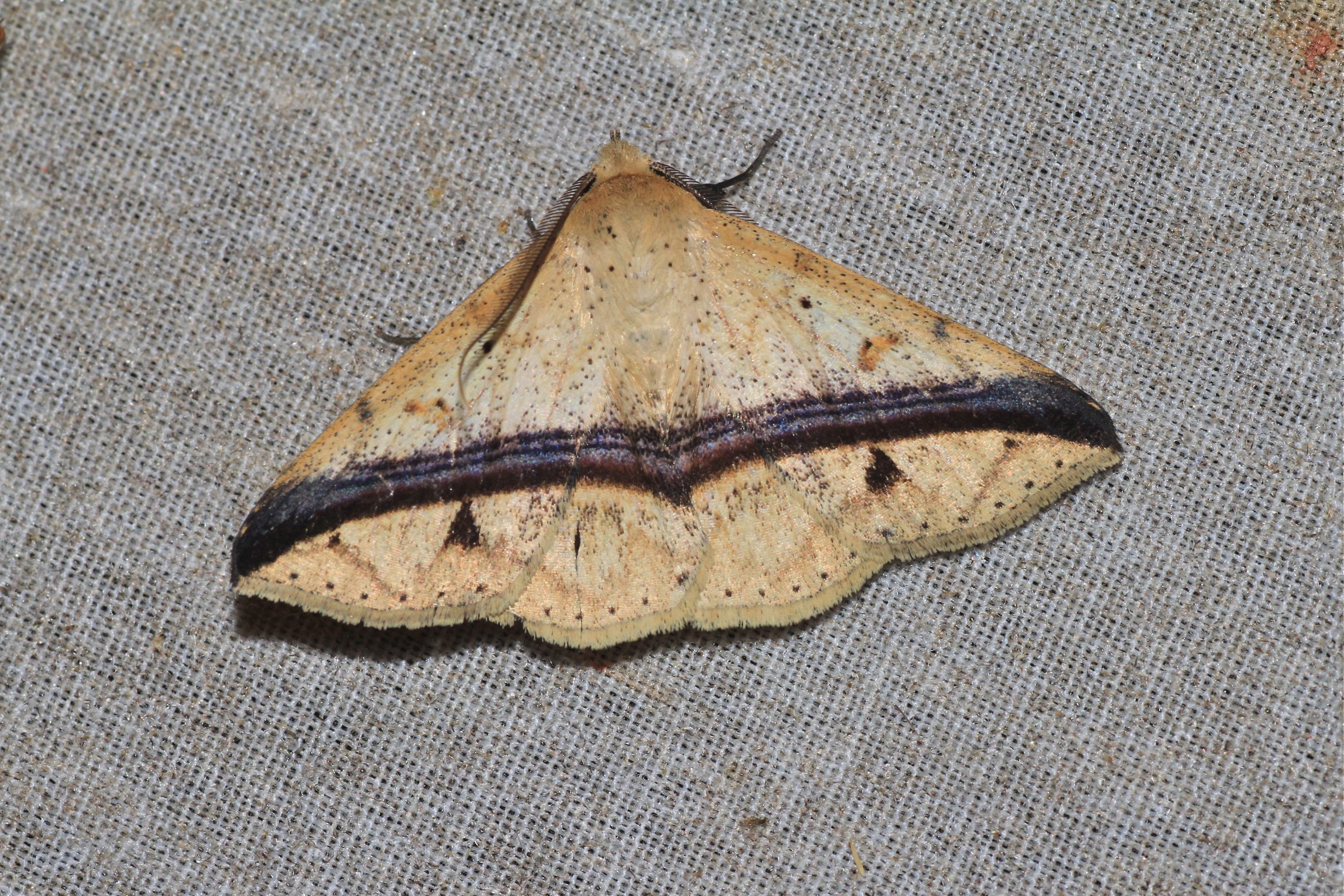

Scientific classification
- Domain: Eukaryota
- Kingdom: Animalia
- Phylum: Arthropoda
- Class: Insecta
- Order: Lepidoptera
- Superfamily: Noctuoidea
- Family: Erebidae
- Genus: Ugia
- Species: U. eugrapha

Binomial name
- Ugia eugrapha (C. Swinhoe, 1907)

Synonyms
- Focilla eugrapha C. Swinhoe, 1907

= Ugia eugrapha =

Species of moth

Ugia eugrapha is a species of moth in the family Erebidae first described by Charles Swinhoe in 1907. It is found in Indonesia (Bali, Borneo, Java, Sumatra) and Thailand.
