= Ugia viridior =

Scientific classification
- Kingdom: Animalia
- Phylum: Arthropoda
- Clade: Pancrustacea
- Class: Insecta
- Order: Lepidoptera
- Superfamily: Noctuoidea
- Family: Erebidae
- Genus: Ugia
- Species: U. viridior

Binomial name
- Ugia viridior Holloway, 2005

Species of moth

Ugia viridior is a species of moth in the family Erebidae. It is found on Sumatra and Borneo and in Singapore. The habitat consists of lowland forests.
