= Ugia albooculata =

Scientific classification
- Kingdom: Animalia
- Phylum: Arthropoda
- Clade: Pancrustacea
- Class: Insecta
- Order: Lepidoptera
- Superfamily: Noctuoidea
- Family: Erebidae
- Genus: Ugia
- Species: U. albooculata

Binomial name
- Ugia albooculata (Saalmüller, 1880)

Synonyms
- Capnodes albooculata Saalmüller, 1880; Tracta albooculata

Species of moth

Ugia albooculata is a species of moth in the family Erebidae. The species is found in northern Madagascar.

This species has a wingspan of 39 mm.
