= Ugia radigera =

Scientific classification
- Domain: Eukaryota
- Kingdom: Animalia
- Phylum: Arthropoda
- Class: Insecta
- Order: Lepidoptera
- Superfamily: Noctuoidea
- Family: Erebidae
- Genus: Ugia
- Species: U. radigera

Binomial name
- Ugia radigera (von Heyden, 1891)

Synonyms
- Sonagra radigera von Heyden, 1891

Species of moth

Ugia radigera is a species of moth in the family Erebidae. It is found in Madagascar.
