= Ugia roseata =

Scientific classification
- Domain: Eukaryota
- Kingdom: Animalia
- Phylum: Arthropoda
- Class: Insecta
- Order: Lepidoptera
- Superfamily: Noctuoidea
- Family: Erebidae
- Genus: Ugia
- Species: U. roseata

Binomial name
- Ugia roseata Gaede, 1940

Species of moth

Ugia roseata is a species of moth in the family Erebidae. It is found in Cameroon.
