= Ugia insuspecta =

Scientific classification
- Domain: Eukaryota
- Kingdom: Animalia
- Phylum: Arthropoda
- Class: Insecta
- Order: Lepidoptera
- Superfamily: Noctuoidea
- Family: Erebidae
- Genus: Ugia
- Species: U. insuspecta

Binomial name
- Ugia insuspecta Galsworthy, 1997

Species of moth

Ugia insuspecta is a species of moth in the family Erebidae. It is found in China, where it has been recorded from Hong Kong.
