= Ugia amaponda =

Scientific classification
- Domain: Eukaryota
- Kingdom: Animalia
- Phylum: Arthropoda
- Class: Insecta
- Order: Lepidoptera
- Superfamily: Noctuoidea
- Family: Erebidae
- Genus: Ugia
- Species: U. amaponda

Binomial name
- Ugia amaponda (Felder & Rogenhofer, 1874)

Synonyms
- Gracilodes amaponda Felder & Rogenhofer, 1874; Thermesia loxogramma Hampson, 1902

Species of moth

Ugia amaponda is a species of moth in the family Erebidae. It is found in Kenya, South Africa and Zimbabwe.
