= Ugia violascens =

Scientific classification
- Domain: Eukaryota
- Kingdom: Animalia
- Phylum: Arthropoda
- Class: Insecta
- Order: Lepidoptera
- Superfamily: Noctuoidea
- Family: Erebidae
- Genus: Ugia
- Species: U. violascens

Binomial name
- Ugia violascens Gaede, 1940

Species of moth

Ugia violascens is a species of moth in the family Erebidae. It is found in Cameroon.
