= Alonina difformis =

Scientific classification
- Kingdom: Animalia
- Phylum: Arthropoda
- Class: Insecta
- Order: Lepidoptera
- Family: Sesiidae
- Genus: Alonina
- Species: A. difformis

Binomial name
- Alonina difformis Hampson, 1919

Species of moth

Alonina difformis is a moth of the family Sesiidae. It is known from South Africa.
