= Adolphus Clemens Good =

American missionary in Africa

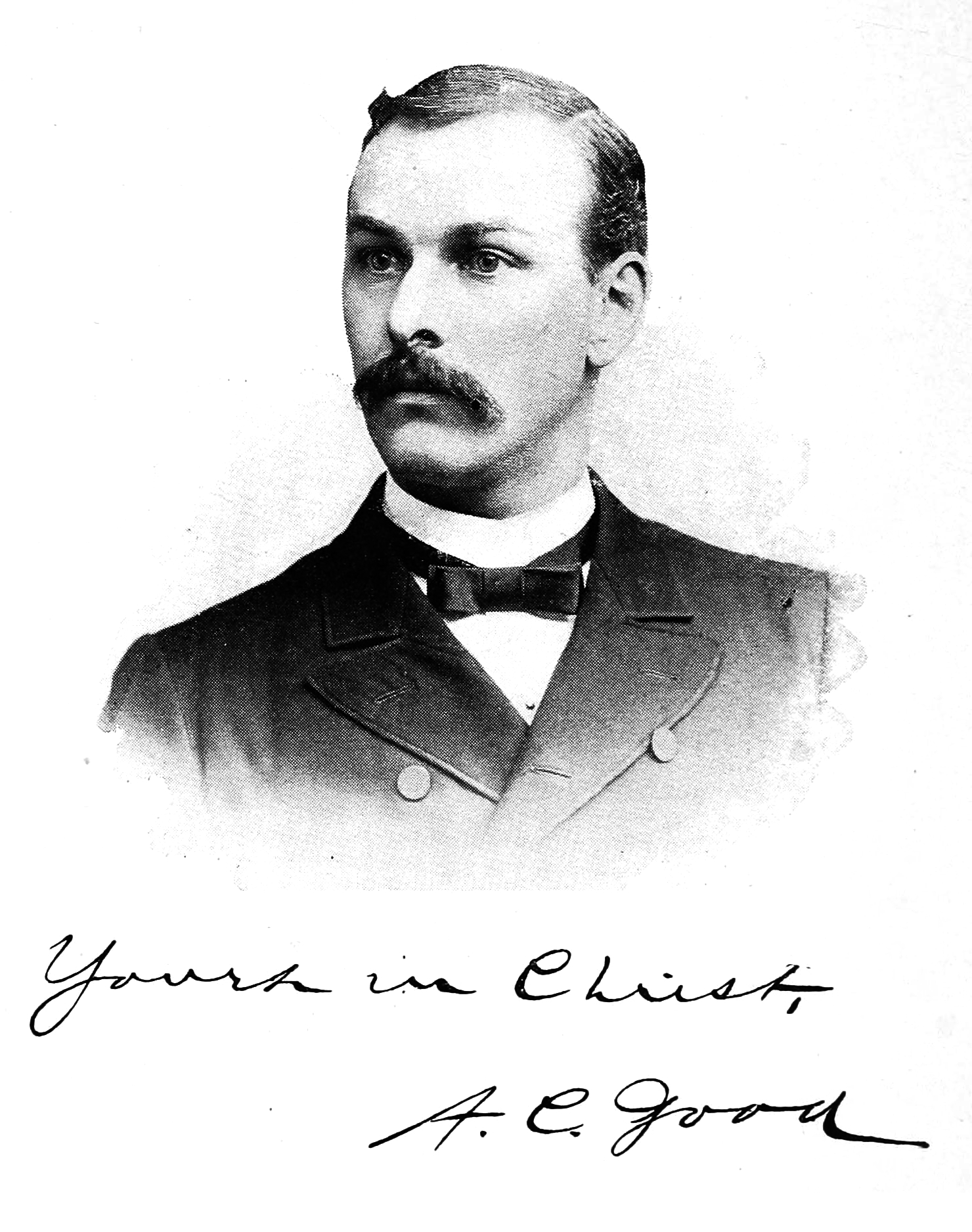

Adolphus Clemens Good (19 December 1856 – 13 December 1894) was an American Presbyterian missionary who worked in west and central Africa. Aside from his missionary work he took an interest in natural history and culture, collecting specimens, and writing on the local languages and culture.

== Life and work ==
Good was born to Abram and Hanah née Irwin in West Mahoning, Pennsylvania and graduated from Washington and Jefferson College in 1879 and was ordained after graduating from the Western Theological Seminary in 1882. He was posted to Baraka in the French Congo. He began to preach there in the local Mpongwe language just ten months later. When the Baraka mission was closed he moved to Kangwe. He explored the regions nearby and established several churches. In 1892 the French insisted on the use of French instead of local languages and the Presbyterian Board had him move into the German territory of Bulu in the Congo (now Cameroon). With his base in Batanga, he collected lepidoptera, birds and mammal specimens to the Western University of Pennsylvania. Several species of moths and butterflies were described from his collections by W.J. Holland. He also made ethnographic and cultural observation on the people around him. During his stay in Africa he lamented the influx of European traders who he noted had an impact on the local women for sexual and other favours - "a large accession of white traders must be supplied with 2 or 3 native women, of course the best educated most in demand." Between 1892 and 1894 he began to compile a Bulu-English dictionary and produced translations of the Gospels into Bulu.

Good married fellow missionary Lydia Walker in 1883. In 1894 he made a journey towards Efulen during which he fell ill and died from blackwater fever. Among the species named after Good are the moths Amata goodii, Phylloxiphia goodii and the butterfly Geritola goodii.
