= Rhabdomantis sosia =

Scientific classification
- Domain: Eukaryota
- Kingdom: Animalia
- Phylum: Arthropoda
- Class: Insecta
- Order: Lepidoptera
- Family: Hesperiidae
- Genus: Rhabdomantis
- Species: R. sosia

Binomial name
- Rhabdomantis sosia (Mabille, 1891)

Synonyms
- Pamphila sosia Mabille, 1891

Species of butterfly

Rhabdomantis sosia, the common large fox, is a butterfly in the family Hesperiidae. It is found in Guinea, Sierra Leone, Liberia, Ivory Coast, Ghana, Nigeria, Cameroon, Gabon, the Republic of the Congo, the Central African Republic and the central part of the Democratic Republic of the Congo. The habitat consists of forests.
