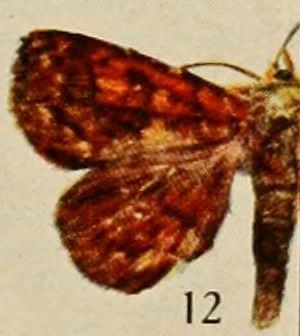
- Phlogochroa rucida

Scientific classification
- Kingdom: Animalia
- Phylum: Arthropoda
- Class: Insecta
- Order: Lepidoptera
- Superfamily: Noctuoidea
- Family: Erebidae
- Subfamily: Calpinae
- Genus: Phlogochroa; Hampson 1926

= Phlogochroa =

Genus of moths

Phlogochroa is a genus of moths of the family Erebidae.

== Species ==
- Phlogochroa albiguttula Hampson, 1926
- Phlogochroa basilewskyi Berio, 1956
- Phlogochroa fontainei Berio, 1956
- Phlogochroa haematoessa (Holland, 1894)
- Phlogochroa haemorrhanta (Bethune-Baker, 1911)
- Phlogochroa madecassa Viette, 1972
- Phlogochroa melanomesa Hampson, 1926
- Phlogochroa pyrochroa (Bethune-Baker, 1909)
- Phlogochroa raketaka Viette, 1972
- Phlogochroa rubida (Holland, 1920)
- Phlogochroa sejuncta (Walker, 1869)
