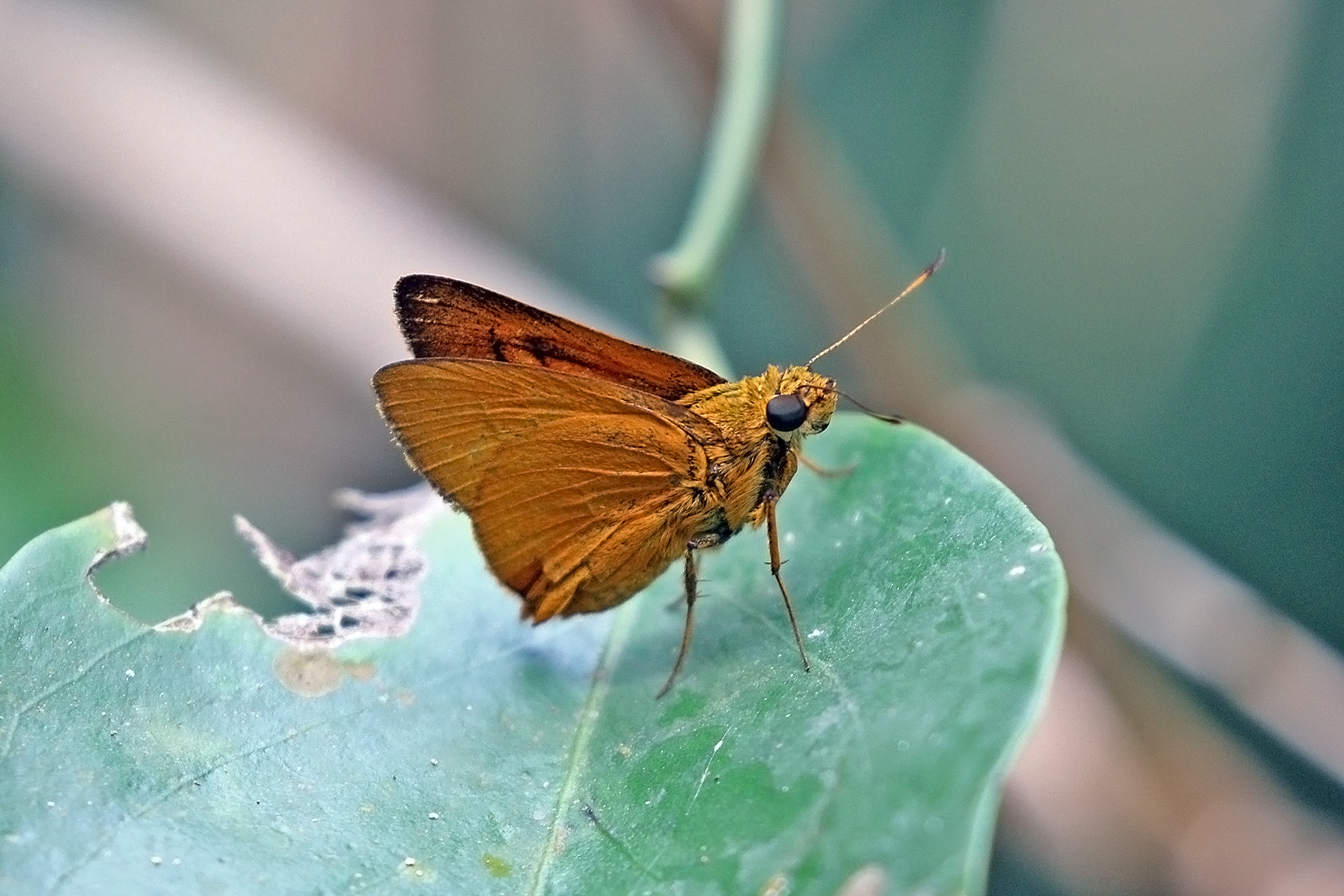
- male, Kakum National Park, Ghana

Scientific classification
- Kingdom: Animalia
- Phylum: Arthropoda
- Clade: Pancrustacea
- Class: Insecta
- Order: Lepidoptera
- Family: Hesperiidae
- Genus: Rhabdomantis
- Species: R. galatia

Binomial name
- Rhabdomantis galatia (Hewitson, 1868)

Synonyms
- Hesperia galatia Hewitson, 1868; Pamphila rhabdophorus Mabille, 1890

= Rhabdomantis galatia =

Species of butterfly

Rhabdomantis galatia, the branded large fox, is a butterfly in the family Hesperiidae. It is found in Sierra Leone, Guinea, Liberia, Ivory Coast, Ghana, Nigeria, Cameroon, the Republic of the Congo, the Central African Republic, the Democratic Republic of the Congo and western Uganda. The habitat consists of forests.

The larvae feed on Trachyphrynium braunianum.

Torben Larsen developed a species numbering system for his 2005 publication Butterflies of West Africa. This species is #1322. The 'Larsen' numbers have since been used with permission in A Sharp Eye on Butterflies of Ghana.
