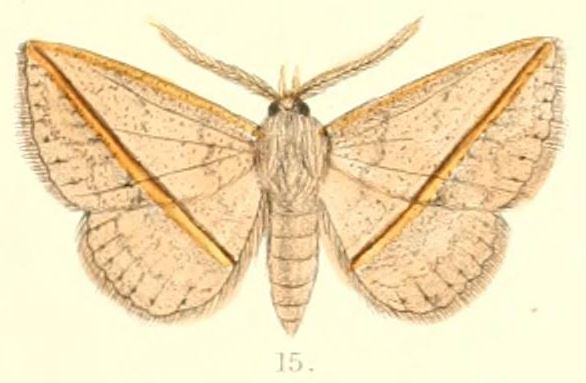
- Ugia transversa

Scientific classification
- Kingdom: Animalia
- Phylum: Arthropoda
- Class: Insecta
- Order: Lepidoptera
- Superfamily: Noctuoidea
- Family: Erebidae
- Tribe: Acantholipini
- Genus: Ugia; Walker, 1858

Synonyms
- Sarthida Walker, 1863; Iluza Walker, 1865; Obba Walker, 1869; Tractia Saalmüller, 1891; Tracta Saalmüller, 1891

= Ugia =

Genus of moths

Ugia is a genus of moths in the family Erebidae erected by Francis Walker in 1858.

== Species ==
- Ugia albilinea Hampson, 1926
- Ugia albooculata (Saalmüller, 1880) (Madagascar)
- Ugia amaponda (Felder & Rogenhofer, 1874)
- Ugia calescens (Holland, 1894)
- Ugia cinerea (Holland, 1894)
- Ugia disjungens Walker, 1858 (Borneo)
- Ugia duplicata Gaede, 1940
- Ugia duplicilinea Hampson, 1926
- Ugia egcarsia (Bethune-Baker, 1911)
- Ugia eugrapha Swinhoe, 1907 (Bali, Borneo, Java, Sumatra, Thailand)
- Ugia flavida Gaede, 1940
- Ugia geometroides (Holland, 1894)
- Ugia hecate (Holland, 1894)
- Ugia insuspecta Galsworthy, 1997
- Ugia malagasy Viette, 1966 (Madagascar)
- Ugia mascusalis (Walker, 1859)
- Ugia mediorufa (Hampson, 1894)
- Ugia minima Gaede, 1940
- Ugia navana Viette, 1966
- Ugia polysticta Hampson, 1926
- Ugia radama Viette, 1966 (Madagascar)
- Ugia radigera (von Heyden, 1891)
- Ugia roseata Gaede, 1940
- Ugia rufilinea Hampson, 1926
- Ugia scopulina Hampson, 1926
- Ugia serrilinea Hampson, 1926 (Borneo, Peninsular Malaysia, Sumatra, Sulawesi, Thailand)
- Ugia sestia (Holland, 1894)
- Ugia signifera Walker, [1863] 1864 (Borneo, Sumatra, Peninsular Malaysia)
- Ugia stigmaphora Hampson, 1926
- Ugia straminilinea Hampson, 1926
- Ugia sundana Hampson, 1924 (Borneo, Java, Sumatra, Thailand)
- Ugia taeniata (Holland, 1894)
- Ugia transversa (Moore 1882) (India)
- Ugia trigonalis Kobes 1982
- Ugia umbrina (Holland, 1894)
- Ugia violascens Gaede, 1940
- Ugia viridior Holloway, 2005 (Borneo, Sarawak, Singapore)

== Former species ==
- Ugia affinis (Snellen, 1858)
