= Ugia rufilinea =

Scientific classification
- Kingdom: Animalia
- Phylum: Arthropoda
- Class: Insecta
- Order: Lepidoptera
- Superfamily: Noctuoidea
- Family: Erebidae
- Genus: Ugia
- Species: U. rufilinea

Binomial name
- Ugia rufilinea Hampson, 1926

Species of moth

Ugia rufilinea is a species of moth in the family Erebidae. It is found in Sierra Leone.
