= Ugia malagasy =

Scientific classification
- Kingdom: Animalia
- Phylum: Arthropoda
- Class: Insecta
- Order: Lepidoptera
- Superfamily: Noctuoidea
- Family: Erebidae
- Genus: Ugia
- Species: U. malagasy

Binomial name
- Ugia malagasy Viette, 1966

Species of moth

Ugia malagasy is a species of moth in the family Erebidae. It is found in Madagascar.
