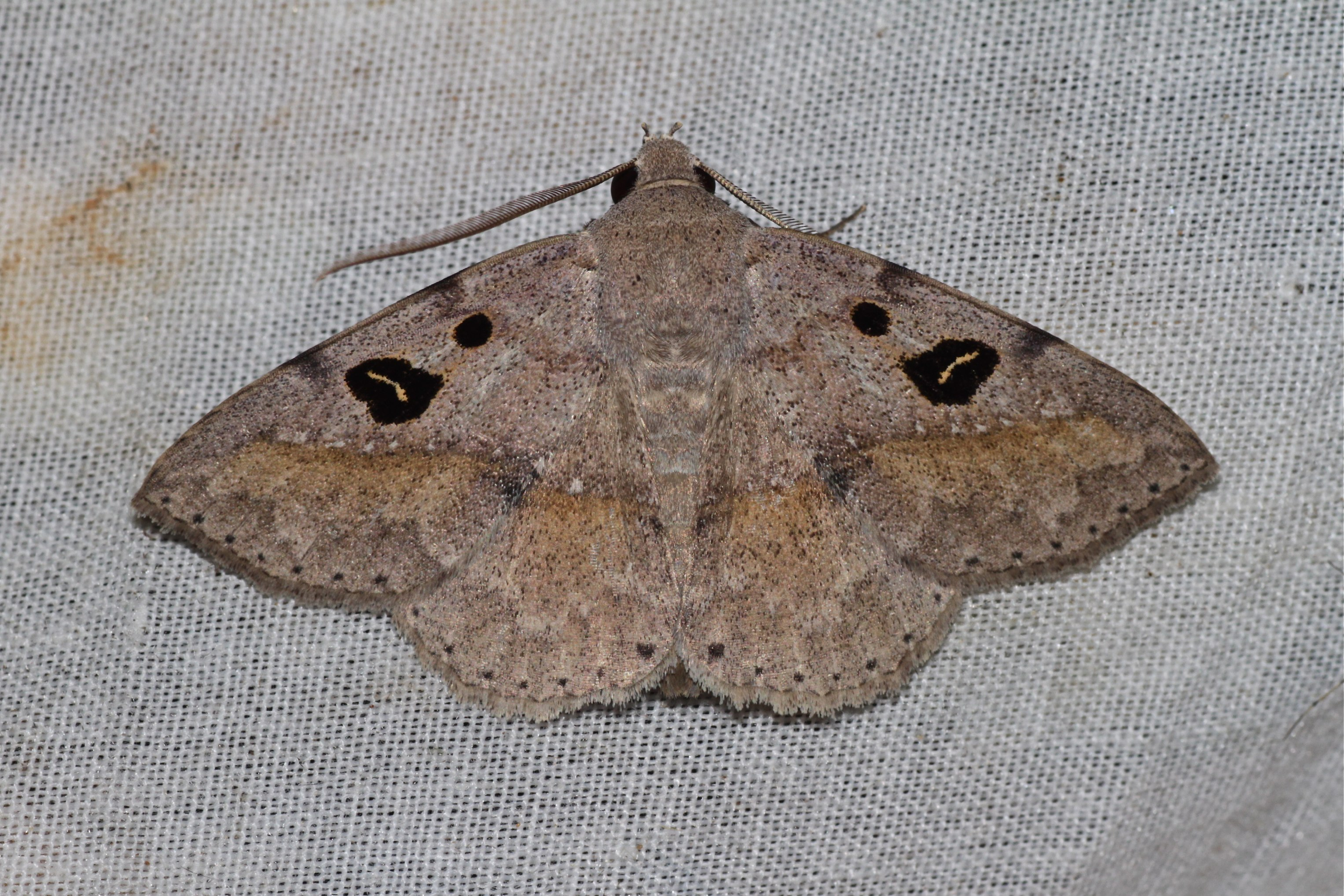
- U. signifera from Malaysia

Scientific classification
- Kingdom: Animalia
- Phylum: Arthropoda
- Class: Insecta
- Order: Lepidoptera
- Superfamily: Noctuoidea
- Family: Erebidae
- Genus: Ugia
- Species: U. signifera

Binomial name
- Ugia signifera (Walker, 1863)

Synonyms
- Sarthida signifera Walker, 1863; Thermesia affinis Snellen, 1858; Iluza affinis; Ugia affinis (Snellen 1858)

= Ugia signifera =

Species of moth

Ugia signifera is a species of moth in the family Erebidae. It is found in Indonesia (Sumatra) and on Borneo and Peninsular Malaysia.
