= Robert Bruce (chancellor) =

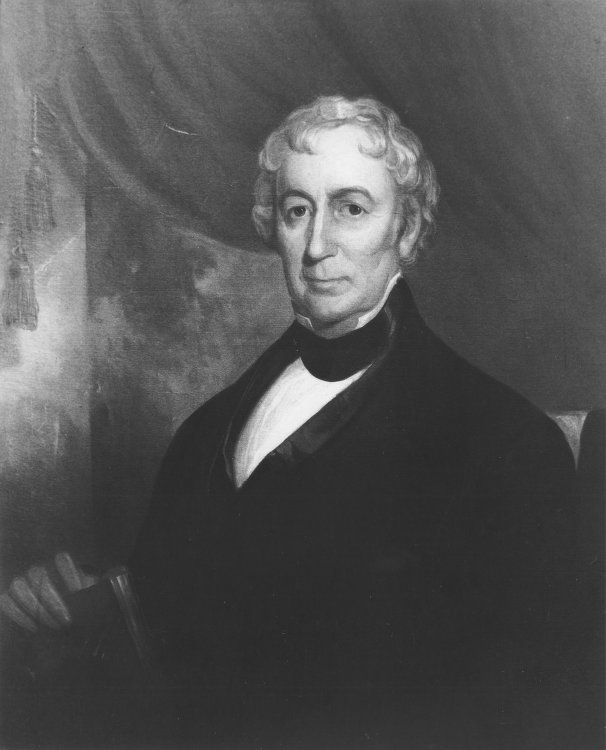

1st Principal of the Western University of Pennsylvania
- In office 1819–1835
- Preceded by: office established
- Succeeded by: Gilbert Morgan
- In office 1836–1843
- Preceded by: Gilbert Morgan
- Succeeded by: Heman Dyer

Personal details
- Born: 20 February 1778 Scone, Perthshire, Scotland
- Died: June 14, 1846 (aged 68) Pittsburgh, Pennsylvania, U.S.
- Education: University of Edinburgh

Reverend Doctor Robert Bruce (1778–1846) is often regarded as the first chancellor of the University of Pittsburgh, then called the Western University of Pennsylvania, serving from 1819 to 1835 and again from 1836 to 1843. During this time the heads of the university held the title of "Principal", a holdover from the institution's academy days, and there were also several Principals prior to Bruce that headed the forerunner to the Western University of Pennsylvania, the Pittsburgh Academy. In 1819 the Pennsylvania legislature modified the 1787 charter of the Pittsburgh Academy to confer university status on the school. This initiated the selection of Reverend Bruce to be principal of the university from 1819 and he served in that capacity until 1835 when Gilbert Morgan was selected as president. Upon Morgan's departure in 1836, Bruce was reinstated to his former position.

Bruce was born in the parish of Scone, Perthshire, Scotland, February 20, 1778, was a graduate of the University of Edinburgh. Bruce was pastor of the First Associate (United) Presbyterian Church of Pittsburgh from 1808 to his death in 1846, and was a professor of natural history, chemistry, and mathematics at the Western University of Pennsylvania from 1820 to 1843.

Thomas Mellon, founder of Mellon Financial Corporation and student at the university under Bruce, described him in his autobiography in the following way:

In Latin and Greek, mathematics and . . . philosophy, Doctor Bruce, the president of the college, heard our recitations. He was one of a class of men rarely met with: modest and retiring of manner, shunning notoriety, and averse to anything that had the appearance of ostentation. He was highly cultured in general literature, an extensive reader, liberal minded, and a most accurate scholar in the several branches he professed. He had all the philosophy of Bacon and Descartes, Hume, Reid, and Dugald Stewart at command – he had himself been a student of Dugald Stewart. . . .
The sentiments of Dr. Bruce's valedictory to our class in September, 1837, have influenced my life and still abide in my memory.
. . . He had the learning of a great scholar and the ability of an apt teacher; and what was no less important to his position, his dignity of manner and kindness of heart secured the love and respect of the students.

Bruce's tenure in leading the university was noted for his decision to allow the admission of the first Black student in 1829. Bruce was known to be one of the leading abolitionists in the Pittsburgh region.

Bruce withdrew from the university in 1843 because of perceived criticism by reform-minded trustees. He then rented some rooms and set up a school, College Duquesne, and a number of Western University students who were members of the Tilghman Literary Society followed him. Before his death, the misunderstanding with the university was cleared up and the charter of College Duquesne was allowed to lapse by 1849. Meanwhile, the Western University of Pennsylvania graduated its own students and, almost thirty years later, the seceding students were officially recognized as university alumni and nineteen survivors were awarded honorary master of arts degrees.

Preceded by Inaugural and Gilbert Morgan	University of Pittsburgh Principal; 1819–1835 and 1836–1843	Succeeded by Gilbert Morgan and Heman Dyer
