= James Mountain =

American lawyer

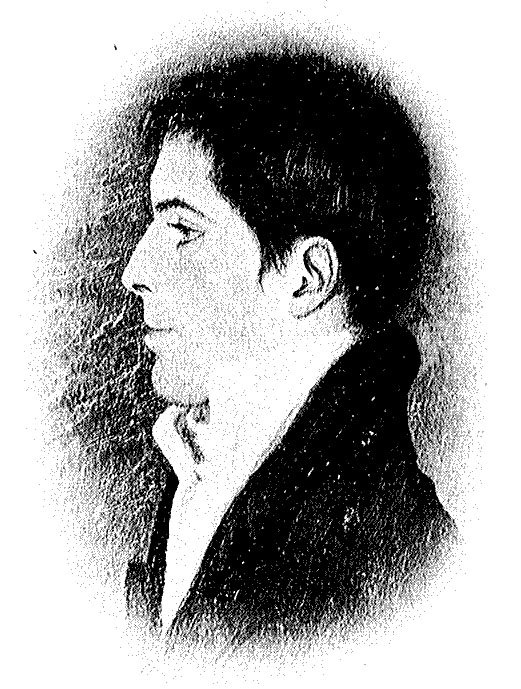
- James Mountain during his time at Pittsburgh Academy
- Born: 1771
- Died: September 23, 1813 (aged 41–42)
- Burial place: First Presbyterian Church, Pittsburgh; later moved to Allegheny Cemetery
- Known for: Master of Pittsburgh Academy

James Mountain (1771 – September 23, 1813) was a prominent lawyer, educator and academic administrator in Western Pennsylvania during the early 19th century. He was Master of Pittsburgh Academy (now University of Pittsburgh) from 1803 to 1807. He was also among the earliest instructors and leaders of Canonsburg Academy (later Jefferson College and now Washington & Jefferson College).
