= John Henry MacCracken =

American academic administrator (1875–1948)

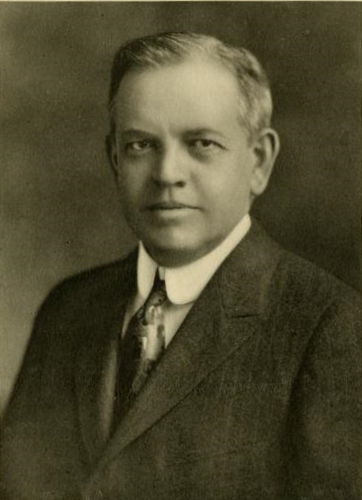
- MacCracken in 1915 at the start of his term at Lafayette

President of Lafayette College
- In office 1915–1927

President of Westminster College
- In office 1899–1903

Personal details
- Born: September 30, 1875 Rochester, Vermont, U.S.
- Died: February 1, 1948 (aged 72) New York City, U.S.
- Spouse: Edith Constable (m. 1910)
- Parent: Henry MacCracken (father)
- Relatives: Henry Noble MacCracken (brother)
- Education: Union Theological Seminary
- Alma mater: New York University; Martin Luther University of Halle-Wittenberg (PhD)

John Henry MacCracken (September 30, 1875 – February 1, 1948) was an American academic administrator who served as president of Westminster College and Lafayette College. When he was chosen as president of Westminster College in 1899, MacCracken was the youngest college president in the United States. MacCracken was the son of Henry MacCracken, a chancellor of New York University, and the brother of Henry Noble MacCracken, a president of Vassar College.

== Early life ==
MacCracken was born in Rochester, Vermont, to Henry MacCracken, a chancellor of New York University (NYU), and the former Catherine Almira Hubbard. He was a descendant of Irish immigrants to Pennsylvania in the mid-18th century. His brother Henry Noble MacCracken became president of Vassar College. John Henry MacCracken attended college preparatory school in New York City.

When he was 15, MacCracken enrolled at NYU and he completed an undergraduate degree in 1894, when he was named class valedictorian. He pursued graduate study at NYU and the Union Theological Seminary before earning a Ph.D. at the Martin Luther University of Halle-Wittenberg in Germany.

== Career ==
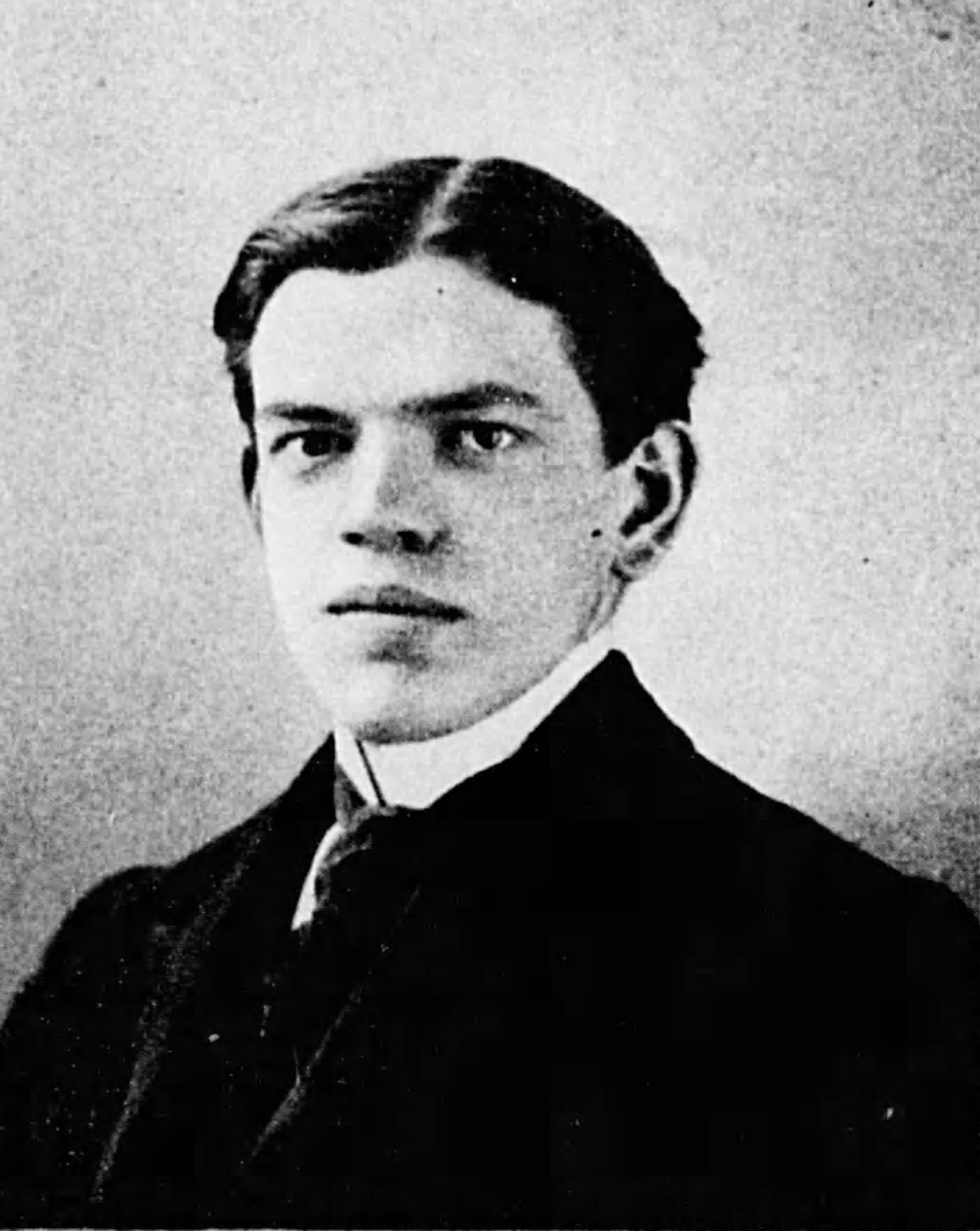
John Henry MacCracken, c. 1899

He joined the NYU faculty in 1896 and was promoted to assistant professor shortly before accepting the role of president at Westminster College in 1899. At the time of his election to the presidency at Westminster College, an NYU source said that the appointment would make him the youngest college president in the United States.

When MacCracken came to Westminster, his age raised alarm among some of the supporters of the university, and his modest personality and quiet nature did not immediately assuage his doubters. Within a few months, MacCracken secured $20,000 in donations for the university, and he was able to increase the variety of academic offerings at the school. When the university's chair of Bible and metaphysics resigned, President MacCracken was named the Sauser Chair of Philosophy and Christian Apologetics. A formal presidential inauguration was held for MacCracken in June 1900.

MacCracken left Westminster College in 1903 to return to NYU as a syndic and professor of politics. He taught one of the earliest courses in city planning in the United States, and he served as vice president of the university senate. In 1914, MacCracken was vice president of the trustees of the American Institute of Christian Philosophy. His father was president.

In 1915, MacCracken was selected as president of Lafayette College. The school's physical plant increased in value under MacCracken, who served until 1927.

During his time as president of Lafayette College, MacCracken was one of the founding advisors during the creation of Alpha Phi Omega, the largest collegiate fraternity in the United States.

== Personal ==
MacCracken married Edith Constable in 1910. MacCracken's father-in-law, Frederick Augustus Constable, managed Arnold Constable & Company in New York, and he was the son of one of the store's original partners. MacCracken's daughter Louise married Robert Olmsted, a trustee of Vassar College and the namesake of the school's biological sciences building. His son Constable was a graduate of Harvard University and Columbia Law School.

Active in the Presbyterian faith, MacCracken spent nearly ten years as president of the Presbyterian college board. He represented the church as a delegate at world conferences in Lausanne, Oxford and Edinburgh.

== Death ==
MacCracken died at his Manhattan home on February 1, 1948. He was survived by his wife, daughter, son and brother.

Academic offices
Preceded by Ethelbert Dudley Warfield	President of Lafayette College; 1915–1926	Succeeded by William Mather Lewis
