= Ice Skating Institute =

The Ice Skating Institute (formerly the Ice Skating Institute of America) is a trade association for ice rinks, and also an international governing body for recreational figure skating. It was founded in 1959 to proliferate the building of permanent indoor ice rinks, which numbered fewer than 100 at the time, as well as to promote skating as a recreational activity. One of the founders was Michael Kirby. The ISI has developed a program of tests and competitions in all areas of figure skating, as well as limited areas of speed skating and ice hockey, from "Tot" levels to advanced tests that would provide interesting challenges even to Olympic medalists.

The ISI operates its programs independently from the International Skating Union, which regulates Olympic-style figure skating competitions, and its national member federations such as U.S. Figure Skating.

== Competition judging ==
ISI competitions differ from those sanctioned by the ISU, USFSA, and other ISU-affiliated national governing bodies in several ways.

- ISI competitions are judged and refereed almost exclusively by professional skating coaches, whose individual score sheets are not disclosed to the public.
- In events that have specific required maneuvers, responsibility for judging those maneuvers is divided among the judges, with each typically responsible for two maneuvers, and one or two other characteristics of the program, such as "correctness" or "duration".
- The event referee normally establishes a point range at the beginning of any given event, based on the number of skaters, and except for mandatory penalty scores, the judges are normally required to stay within that range.
- ISI judging has an "against the book" concept, in which a skater (or team) who is alone in his/her/their event competes against a standard of 80% of the possible points for first place, or 79.9% for second. (Until the 2010 Revision, under 60% resulted in a third place).
- Competitions are structured to provide encouragement and reward participation by dividing competitors into small groups. When more than five skaters or teams are competing in the same event (which is generally discouraged), those not placing in the top five are considered to be tied for sixth place.
- Competitions frequently keep team standings, with each first-place award also contributing five points to the skater's team (typically their home rink), four points for second-place, and so forth. This also serves to encourage maximum participation.
- The ISI does not have "qualifying" rounds or "qualifying" competitions: any individual member in good standing who is not considered a professional skater may enter any event open to his or her age and test level, at any competition offering age- and level-appropriate events, with the only exception being that most rinks have "in-house" competitions, confined to those who skate regularly at that rink.
- ISI competitions do not link events together: unlike serious competitions, in which skaters might be required to skate both "short" and "long" programs, with the final results being a composite of the two programs, each ISI event is (except for its effect on team standings) a single program skated "in a vacuum." On the other hand, a typical ISI competition will offer a very wide variety of individual events, including "freestyle," "footwork," "interpretive" (i.e., an extemporaneous program improvised to music not revealed to the skaters until the warmup), and possibly several types of "spotlight" programs (i.e., show-type programs that may include props of various types).
- The ISI still offers both testing and competition in figures, including not only standardized figures from the rulebook, but also figures designed by the skaters themselves.
- There is a certain amount of difference in competition judging, depending upon the attitudes, policies, and general emphasis of the host rink: rinks with strong programs in the serious end of the sport tend to structure and judge ISI competitions almost as if they were ISU or USFS competitions (emphasizing the ISI's role as a "farm system" for the serious end of the sport), whereas rinks primarily catering to recreational skaters tend to structure and judge their competitions in such a way as to maximize the number of awards handed out (emphasizing the ISI's role of promoting skating as a purely recreational activity). This difference is not so noticeable in events with two or more competitors, but is far more noticeable when skaters compete against the book (in some competitions, placing second or third against the book can be quite common, while in others, it might be all but unheard-of).

== Testing ==
The ISI testing program is considerably broader in scope than its counterpart in the serious end of the sport: tests are offered in a slightly wider variety of disciplines, and there are test levels ranging from extremely elementary (such as the "Tot 1-4" levels for very young children, and the "Pre-Alpha" test for skaters not yet ready for the "Alpha" through "Delta" basic skills levels) through the various "level 10" tests in the figure skating disciplines (e.g., "Freestyle 10," "Figure 10"), which pose non-trivial challenges even for world-class skaters. Most tests can be judged and certified by any professional member, but the higher levels must be judged by, or with mandatory video review by, judges selected by the national office.
