= MacCracken Hall =

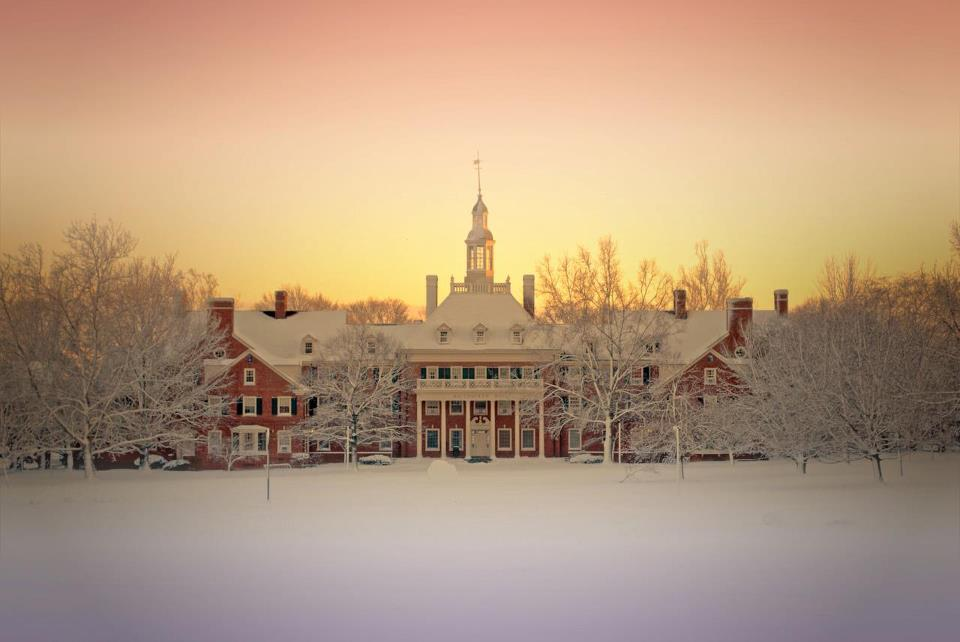
- View of MacCracken Hall from Central Quad

- Location within Ohio
- Former names: Center Hall

General information
- Type: Women's Dormitory
- Architectural style: Georgian
- Location: Oxford, Ohio, 500 Center Drive, Oxford, Ohio 45056, United States of America
- Coordinates: 39°30′14.84″N 84°44′4.63″W
- Elevation: 274 m (899 ft)
- Completed: Spring of 1961
- Inaugurated: 16 September 1961
- Cost: $1.69 million
- Client: Miami University of Ohio
- Owner: Miami University

Design and construction
- Architects: Cellarius & Hilmarn
- Main contractor: Knowlton Construction

MacCracken Hall is a women's residence hall on Miami University's campus in Oxford, Ohio. It is named after Miami Graduate Henry Mitchell MacCracken. It is located on Miami University's Central Quad, and currently houses four sorority chapters: Alpha Chi Omega, Chi Omega, Kappa Alpha Theta, and Kappa Delta.

== Construction and planning ==
MacCracken Hall was built by Knowlton Construction with architects Cellarius & Hilmer between 1957 and 1961. The West Wing was opened in September 1957. While the Central and East Wings were under construction, the dormitory was called Center Hall. After the hall was fully completed in the spring of 1961, it was renamed MacCracken Hall. The entire project cost $1.69 million, stands at 76,940 sq ft (7,148 m^{2}), and holds a maximum capacity of 275 people. The brick construction contains three chimneys, three and a half stories, and a basement.

== History ==
Miami Lodges was constructed on the spot where MacCracken Hall is currently located in 1947, to house approximately 600 men who came to campus after World War II. MacCracken Hall was dedicated on the morning of Saturday, September 16, 1961, at a ceremony held to dedicate all of the buildings constructed between 1940 and 1962. MacCracken Hall initially housed six sorority houses, two large recreation rooms, two living rooms, and a large dining facility.

== Henry Mitchell MacCracken ==
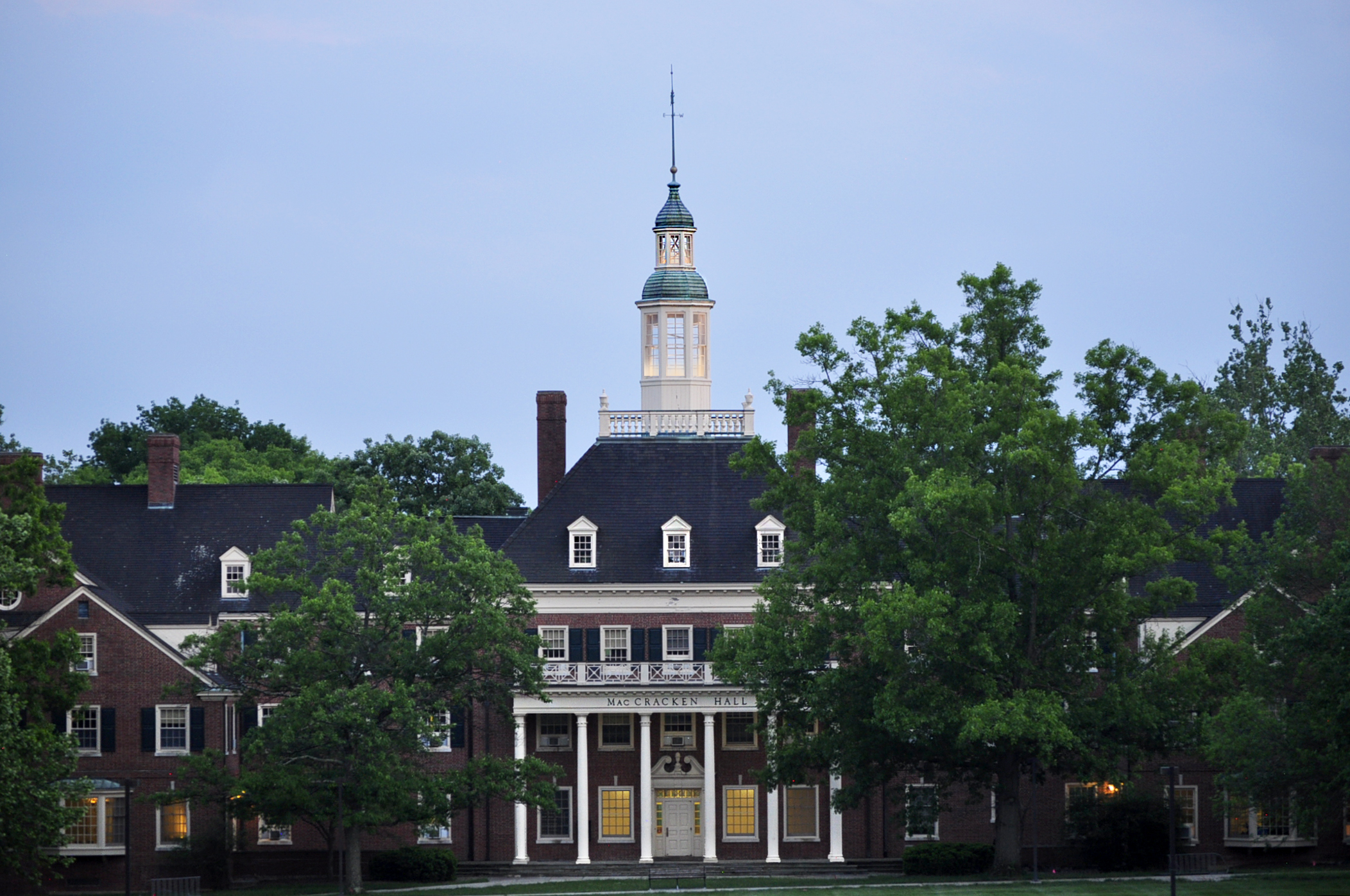
MacCracken Hall, located on Central Quad.

MacCracken Hall was named after Henry Mitchell MacCracken, "one of America's outstanding nineteenth century educators" and an 1857 graduate of Miami University. MacCracken was born in Oxford, Ohio on September 28, 1840, and he entered Miami University in 1852, when he was only 12 years old. He graduated before his 17th birthday in 1857, began teaching at Grove Academy in Cedarville, Ohio, and soon became the principal of schools in South Charleston, Ohio in 1858.

In 1860, MacCracken moved to Xenia, Ohio and began theological studies at the United Presbyterian Seminary. He completed his education at the Princeton Theological Seminary in 1863, then traveled Europe to pursue philosophical and theological studies abroad. When he returned to America in 1868, he became the Pastor of First Presbyterian Church in Toledo, Ohio. MacCracken was chosen to the chancellorship of the Western University of Pennsylvania at Pittsburgh in 1881, and in 1896, he became the chancellor and was on the faculty for University of the City of New York, renamed in 1896 as New York University. He also co-authored a history of New York University in 1901, and in 1900, MacCracken conceived the idea for the Hall of Fame for Great Americans.

In retirement, Henry MacCracken devoted his life to travel, and studied educational conditions around the world. He delivered several historical addresses to different countries while he was abroad. MacCracken died in Orlando, Florida on December 24, 1918, at the age of 78.

== MacCracken Today ==
Today, MacCracken Hall is located on Central Quad, and along with the sorority suites, houses a Learning Technologies Center. It is located amidst many dining options; it is connected to Market Street at MacCracken, is next to Scott Hall, and is very close to Harris Dining Hall and Hamilton Dining Hall. It currently houses four sorority chapters: Alpha Chi Omega, Chi Omega, Kappa Alpha Theta and Kappa Delta. Not only are these sorority suites located in MacCracken Hall, but the girls in the youngest pledge class of these sororities also live in the dormitory. The current address of MacCracken is: 500 Center Drive, Oxford, Ohio.

MacCracken Hall has recently become featured on the Miami University Student ID Cards. Students can use these cards to swipe for many things, including getting into their residence halls, rooms, and to pay for food on campus.
