= McCrackin =

McCrackin is a surname. Notable people with the surname include:

- Daisy McCrackin (born 1979), American actor and singer-songwriter
- Maurice McCrackin (1905–1997), American activist

== See also ==
- McCracken (surname)
