= Milton Goff =

Seventh Chancellor of the university of Pittsburgh

7th Chancellor of the Western University of Pennsylvania
- In office 1884–1890
- Preceded by: Henry MacCracken
- Succeeded by: William Jacob Holland

Personal details
- Born: December 17, 1831
- Died: November 8, 1890 (aged 58)

Milton B. Goff (December 17, 1831 – November 8, 1890) was the seventh chancellor of the University of Pittsburgh, then called the Western University of Pennsylvania, serving from 1884 to 1890. He also served as acting chancellor from 1880 to 1881.

Preceded by Henry MacCracken	University of Pittsburgh Chancellor; 1884–1890	Succeeded by William Jacob Holland
