= John F. McLaren =

4th Principal of the Western University of Pennsylvania
- In office 1855–1858
- Preceded by: Heman Dyer
- Succeeded by: George Woods

Another portrait of John F. McLaren

John F. McLaren is generally numbered as the fourth chancellor of the University of Pittsburgh, then called the Western University of Pennsylvania, serving from 1855 to 1858, although McLaren's official title at the time was "Principal" which was a holdover from the institutions academy days. McLaren took over the leadership of university following the suspension of its operations in 1849 after, for the second time in less than five years, a major Pittsburgh fire had destroyed the university's buildings, equipment, and records. The university reopened in 1854. McLaren was formally inaugurated as Principal on December 19, 1856.

Preceded by Heman Dyer	University of Pittsburgh Principal; 1855–1858	Succeeded by George Woods
