= George Woods (Pitt Chancellor) =

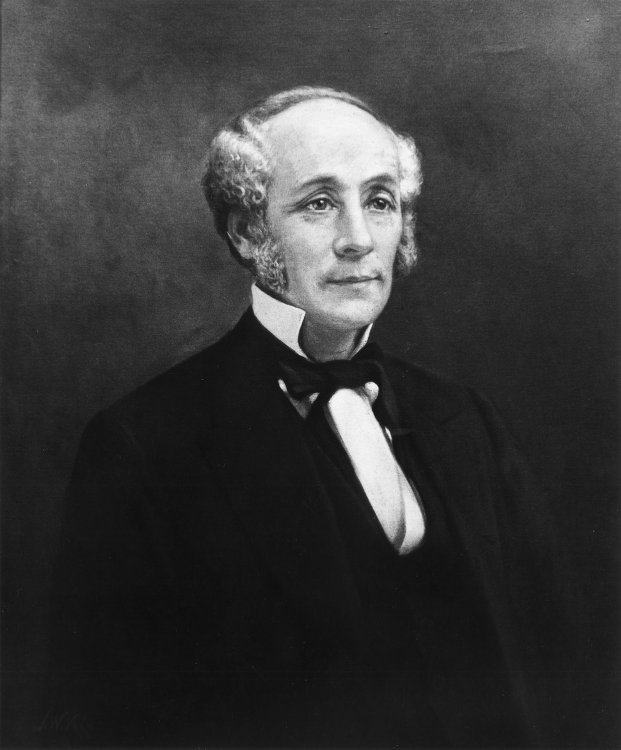

5th Chancellor of the Western University of Pennsylvania
- In office 1858–1880
- Preceded by: John F. McLaren
- Succeeded by: Henry MacCracken

George Woods was an American college administrator. He was the fifth chancellor of the University of Pittsburgh, then called the Western University of Pennsylvania. He served in that capacity from 1858 to 1880.

== Biography ==
Although Woods is generally numbered as Pitt's fifth chancellor, he was actually the first head of the university to have the title "Chancellor" as previously heads of the university were referred to as "Principal", a holdover from the institution's academy days. Woods has been credited with creating the university's endowment, founding the science and engineering programs, and dramatically increasing enrollment.

During the early 1850s, Woods, then a resident of Yarmouth, Maine, established the Yarmouth Institute as a direct competitor to the North Yarmouth Academy. Although it attracted students from as far afield as Cuba, his institute lacked a sufficient endowment and closed after five years.

In 1859, while serving in his new role at the University of Pittsburgh, a lawsuit involving his dispute with NYA precipitated the split in Yarmouth's First Parish Church.

== Personal life ==
Woods' father was an abolitionist in Yarmouth, Maine.

Preceded by John McLaren	University of Pittsburgh Chancellor; 1858–1880	Succeeded by Henry MacCracken
