= McCracken (surname) =

McCracken is a hereditary surname derived from Ulster and nearby Galloway, Scotland. It is an Anglicisation of Mac Reachtain an Ulster Irish variant of the patronymic surname Mac Neachtain (commonly Anglicised as McNaughton). Notable people with the surname include:

- Annie Virginia McCracken (1868–?), American author
- Bert McCracken (born 1982), American vocalist
- Billy McCracken (1883–1979), Northern Ireland football player
- Bob McCracken (1904-1972), American jazz clarinetist
- Branch McCracken (1908–1970), American basketball coach
- Brian McCracken (born 1934), Irish jurist and Justice of the Irish Supreme Court
- Craig McCracken (born 1971), American animator
- Daniel D. McCracken (1930–2011) American computer scientist
- David McCracken (born 1981) Scottish football player
- Dougie McCracken (1964–2011), Scottish footballer
- Eileen McCracken (1920–1988), Irish botanist
- Edward R. McCracken American businessman
- Elizabeth McCracken (born 1966), American author
- Esther McCracken (1902–1971), British actress and playwright
- Frederick McCracken (1859-1949), British general
- Harold McCracken (1894–1983), American author
- Harry McCracken (born 1964), American journalist, editor in chief of PC World
- Harry McCracken (footballer), Northern Irish footballer
- Henry Joy McCracken (1767–1798), Irish rebel
- Henry Noble McCracken (1880-1970), American chancellor of New York University
- Herb McCracken (1899–1995), American football coach
- Hugh McCracken (1942–2013), American musician
- J. J. McCracken (born 1972), American artist
- Jack McCracken (1911–1958), American basketball player
- Jack McCracken (Scouting)
- James McCracken (1926–1988), American tenor
- Janet McCracken, American academic
- Jarrod McCracken, New Zealand rugby league player
- Jeff McCracken (born 1952), American actor, director, and producer
- Jeremy McCracken, British television director
- Joan McCracken (1917–1961), American actress and dancer
- John McCracken (artist) (1934-2011), American artist
- Jon McCracken (born 2000), Scottish footballer
- Josephine Clifford McCracken (1839–1921), German-born American
- Josiah McCracken (1874–1952), US college football All American and Olympic medal winner
- Krista McCracken, Canadian public historian and archivist
- Mark McCracken (born 1960), American actor
- Mary Ann McCracken (1770–1866), Irish radical and anti-slavery campaigner
- Mary Isabel McCracken (1866–1955), American entomologist
- Paul McCracken (basketball) (born 1950), NBA and Maccabi Tel Aviv basketball player
- Paul McCracken (economist) (1915–2012), American economist and former chairman of the President's Council of Economic Advisers
- Peter Hale McCracken, American founder of Serials Solutions
- Philip McCracken (1928–2021), American artist
- Quinton McCracken (born 1970), American major league baseball player
- Robert McCracken (footballer) (1890–unknown), Northern Irish professional footballer
- Robert McCracken (born 1968), United Kingdom professional boxer
- Robert M. McCracken (1874–1934), American politician
- Sandra McCracken (born 1977), American musician
- Thomas McCracken Jr. (born 1952), American lawyer and politician
- Voros McCracken (born 1971), American sabermetrician
- William McCracken (c. 1864 – 1940), American football coach and college educator
