= Henry Noble MacCracken =

American academic administrator (1880–1970)

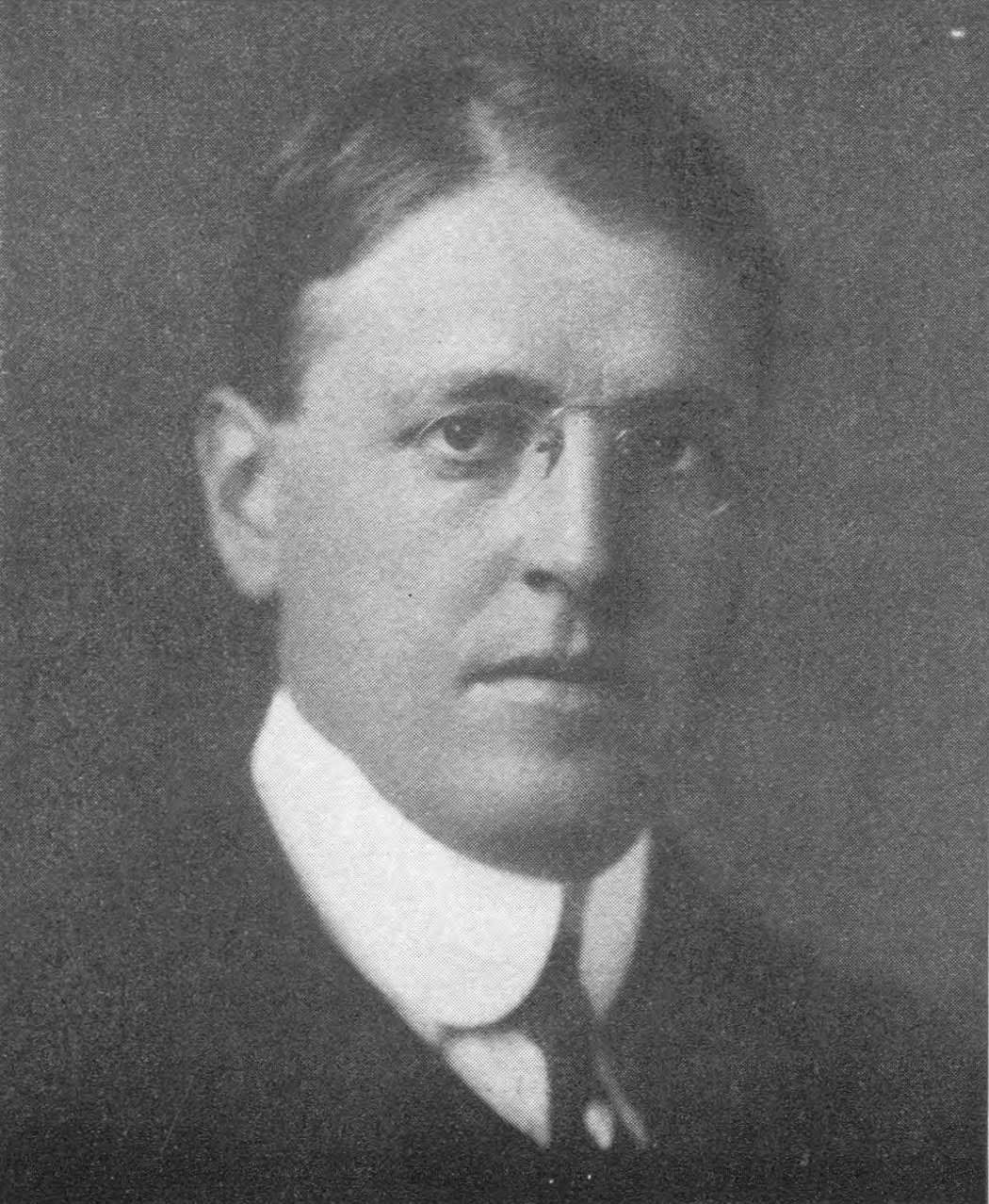

5th President of Vassar College
- In office 1915–1946
- Preceded by: James Monroe Taylor
- Succeeded by: Sarah Gibson Blanding

Personal details
- Born: November 19, 1880 Toledo, Ohio, United States
- Died: May 7, 1970 (aged 89) Poughkeepsie, New York, United States
- Spouse: Marjorie Dodd (m. 1907)
- Education: New York University (English/M.A., 1900/1904); Harvard University (M.A./Ph.D., 1905/1907)

Henry Noble MacCracken (November 19, 1880 – May 7, 1970) was an American academic administrator who was the fifth president of Vassar College in Poughkeepsie, New York, serving from 1915 to 1946 as the first secular president of the college. MacCracken's term as president of Vassar College is the longest in the college's history.

== Early life ==
MacCracken was born in Toledo, Ohio on November 19, 1880, to Henry Mitchell MacCracken. Henry's brother was John Henry MacCracken, president (1915–26) of Lafayette College. In 1900, MacCracken earned an English degree from New York University (NYU). After graduation, he joined the faculty of Syrian Protestant College in Beirut for three years before coming back to NYU for graduate study. After completing a master's degree in English at NYU, he earned an additional MA and a Ph.D. from Harvard University.

On June 12, 1907, MacCracken married Marjorie Dodd. His son, Calvin Dodd MacCracken, was a noted inventor.

In 1920, he and his wife joined Henry Seidel Canby, and other friends in founding Yelping Hill Association, a community in Northwestern Connecticut.

== Career ==
MacCracken was president of Vassar from 1915 to 1946. A proponent of women's suffrage and liberal political views in general, MacCracken was fired for holding such beliefs in 1918. However, three trustees resigned and students protested, so MacCracken was returned to his position.

In the 1920s, MacCracken was involved in the founding of Sarah Lawrence College, which was initially a women's junior college affiliated with Vassar. A residence hall named after MacCracken was completed in 1930. He was on the board of trustees of the college until its affiliation with Vassar was severed in 1935.

== Later life ==
MacCracken died on May 7, 1970, at his home, 87 New Hackensack Road, in Poughkeepsie, New York. His wife, Marjorie Dodd MacCracken died in 1974.
