= Heman Dyer =

American university administrator

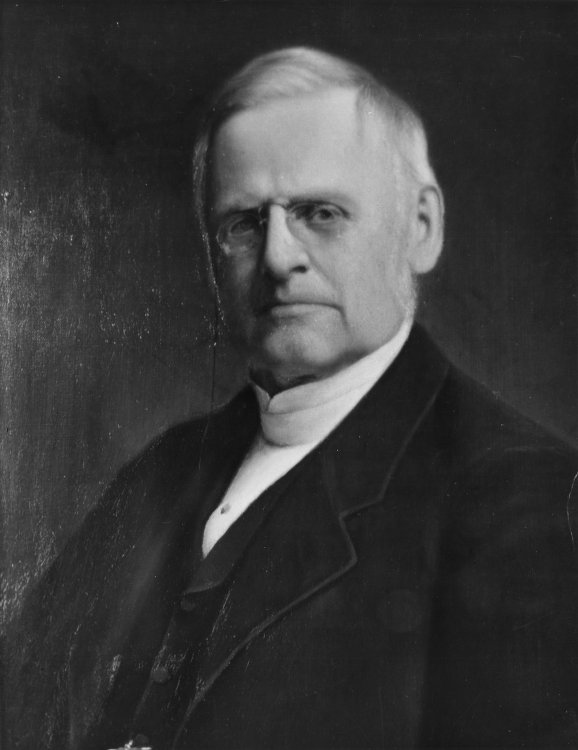

3rd Principal of the Western University of Pennsylvania
- In office 1836–1849
- Preceded by: Robert Bruce
- Succeeded by: John F. McLaren

Personal details
- Born: September 24, 1810 Shaftsbury, Vermont, U.S.
- Died: July 29, 1900 (aged 89) New York City, U.S.

Heman Dyer (September 24, 1810 – July 29, 1900) is generally numbered as the third chancellor of the University of Pittsburgh, then called the Western University of Pennsylvania, serving from 1836 to 1849, although McLaren's official title at the time was "Principal", a holdover from the institution's academy days. Dyer was President of the university until, for the second time in less than five years, a major Pittsburgh fire had destroyed the university's buildings, equipment, and records. The university subsequently suspended operations in order to rebuild and regroup and reopened in 1854.

== Biography ==
Heman Dyer was born in Shaftsbury, Vermont on September 24, 1810.

He died in New York City on July 29, 1900.

Preceded by Robert Bruce	University of Pittsburgh Principal; 1843–1849	Succeeded by John McLaren
