= Henry MacCracken =

American academic administrator (1840–1918)

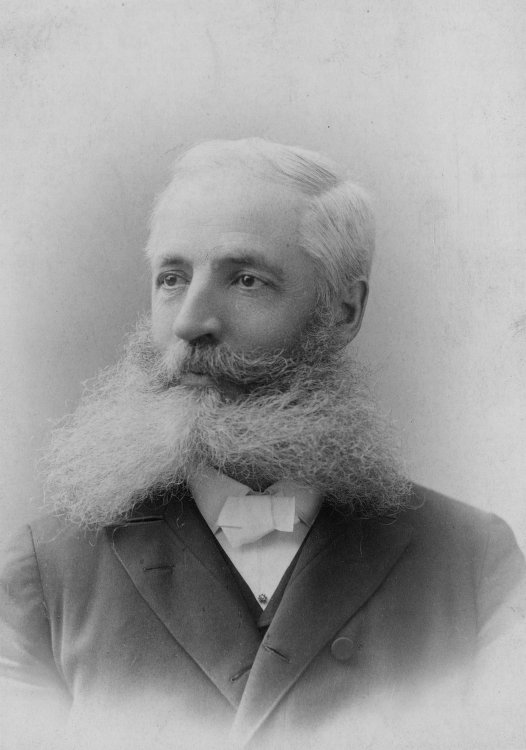

6th Chancellor of New York University
- In office 1891–1911
- Preceded by: John Hall
- Succeeded by: Elmer Ellsworth Brown

6th Chancellor of the Western University of Pennsylvania
- In office 1881–1884
- Preceded by: George Woods
- Succeeded by: Milton Goff

Personal details
- Born: Henry Mitchell MacCracken; September 28, 1840 Oxford, Ohio, U.S.
- Died: December 24, 1918 (aged 78) Orlando, Florida, U.S.
- Resting place: Woodlawn Cemetery
- Children: Henry Noble MacCracken; John Henry MacCracken
- Education: Miami University

Henry Mitchell MacCracken (September 28, 1840 – December 24, 1918) was an American educator and academic administrator.

== Biography ==
Henry MacCracken was born in Oxford, Ohio on September 28, 1840. He graduated from Miami University in Ohio in 1857. After a brief teaching career, he entered the Presbyterian ministry in 1863. From 1881 to 1884 he served as the sixth chancellor of the University of Pittsburgh, then called the Western University of Pennsylvania.

In 1884 he was appointed professor of philosophy and vice chancellor of New York University, becoming chancellor in 1891. Before his retirement in 1910, the University Heights campus was acquired, a graduate school and schools of commerce and pedagogy were founded, and the university medical school was strengthened by union with Bellevue Hospital medical college. While chancellor he was responsible for the creation of Hall of Fame for Great Americans on the campus and using the term "Hall of Fame" in English, inspired by Munich's Ruhmeshalle ("hall of fame" in German).

Henry MacCracken died in Orlando, Florida on December 24, 1918. He was buried at Woodlawn Cemetery in The Bronx, New York City.

Henry Noble MacCracken, president of Vassar College from 1915 to 1946, and John Henry MacCracken, president of Lafayette College from 1915 to 1926, were his sons.

== Legacy ==
MacCracken Hall, a residence hall at Miami University bears his name.

His former residence on the campus of Bronx Community College also carries the name MacCracken Hall.

== Popular culture ==
On a July 2013 episode of the satirical television program The Colbert Report, Henry Mitchel MacCracken, who penned a 1904 New York Times article on the moral risks of college men, was comically portrayed as a still active Times trends section editor after the newspaper published a similarly themed article in 2013.

Academic offices
Preceded by George Woods	University of Pittsburgh Chancellor; 1881–1884	Succeeded by Milton Goff
Preceded by John Hall	Chancellor of New York University; 1891–1911	Succeeded by Elmer Ellsworth Brown
