= William Jacob Holland =

American scientist (1848–1932)

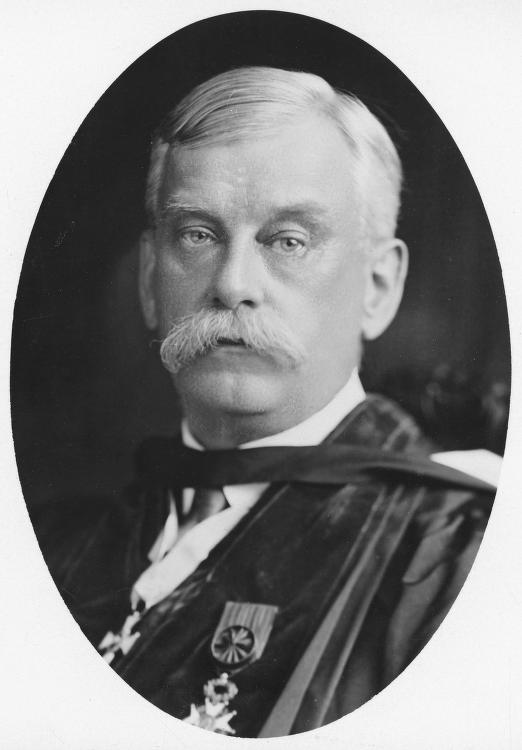

8th Chancellor of the Western University of Pennsylvania (University of Pittsburgh)
- In office 1891–1901
- Preceded by: Milton Goff
- Succeeded by: Samuel McCormick

Personal details
- Born: August 16, 1848 Jamaica
- Died: December 13, 1932 (aged 84) Pittsburgh, Pennsylvania U.S.
- Education: Moravian College (BA); Amherst College (BA)

Rev William Jacob Holland FRSE LLD (August 16, 1848 – December 13, 1932) was the eighth Chancellor of the University of Pittsburgh (1891–1901) and Director of the Carnegie Museums of Pittsburgh. He was an accomplished lepidopterist, zoologist, and paleontologist, as well as an ordained Presbyterian minister.

== Life ==
Holland was born August 16, 1848, in Jamaica, West Indies, the son of Rev Francis R Holland and his wife, Eliza Augusta Wolle.

He spent his early years in Salem, North Carolina, later attending Nazareth Hall, a Moravian boys' school in Pennsylvania, then to Moravian College in Bethlehem, PA (A.B. 1866), followed by Amherst College, (A.B., 1869), and Princeton Theological Seminary (1874). At Amherst, Holland's roommate was a student from Japan, causing Holland to become interested in Japanese and to learn that language well before it was a common pursuit in the United States.

In 1874 he moved to Pittsburgh, Pennsylvania to become pastor of the Bellefield Presbyterian Church in the city's Oakland neighborhood. At this time Holland was also a trustee of the Pennsylvania College for Women (now Chatham University), where he taught ancient languages. He also was active in the sciences, serving as a naturalist for the United States Eclipse Expedition, which in 1887, at the bequest of the National Academy of Sciences and the U.S. Navy, explored Japan. In 1879 Holland married Carrie T. Moorhead, a daughter of a wealthy Pittsburgh family. They had three children.

In 1891 he became chancellor of Pitt, where he taught anatomy and zoology. His 1890s administration is best known for dramatically increasing the size and scope of the university (then called the Western University of Pennsylvania). He described many species from West Africa that were collected by the Presbyterian missionary Adolphus Clemens Good. In 1901 his friend Andrew Carnegie hired him as director of the Carnegie Museum, where he remained until retirement in 1922. Holland was then given the title of emeritus Director of the Museum upon his retirement until his death in 1932. He was elected to the American Philosophical Society in 1928.

He died on December 13, 1932, and was buried at Allegheny Cemetery, Pittsburgh. He is noted to have been the first Director of the Carnegie Museum of Natural History on his tombstone, which was then debunked by the museum.

== Work ==
Holland's main interest was in lepidopterology, but he trained himself as a paleontologist when he assumed the directorship of the Carnegie Museum. As director of the Carnegie Museums, Holland achieved international renown for supervising the mounting of several casts of the sauropod dinosaur Diplodocus, a donation by Carnegie to natural history museums throughout Europe. His trip to Argentina in 1912 to install a replica of a Diplodocus, at the behest of Carnegie, is told by Holland in his 1913 travel book To the River Plate and Back. The Diplodocus campaign earned him his share of international recognition as well, in the form of a French legion d'honneur and a German knight's cross, among others.

Holland was America's great popularizer of butterflies and moths in the first half of the twentieth century. Holland's The Butterfly Book (1898) and The Moth Book (1903) are both still widely used. Holland donated his private collection exceeding 250,000 specimens to the Carnegie Museum. He supported active collectors worldwide, obtaining major collections from previously uncollected regions between 1890 and 1930 through the efforts of William Doherty, Herbert Huntingdon Smith, Hymen Lawrence Weber, José Steinbach, Samuel Milton Klages, and many others.

== Legacy ==
The University of Pittsburgh's Holland Hall at 3990 Fifth Avenue is named in his honor. It is a student residence for 600 first-year women students and is part of the Schenley Quadrangle complex. The University Book Center is on the ground floor of Holland Hall.

Holland was also interested in the history of his forebears, particularly that of his Moravian and Huguenot ancestors in Bethlehem, Pennsylvania, Philadelphia, England, and France. He amassed a considerable amount of material, comprising letters, diaries, portraits, and other artifacts, and donated it to the Historical Society of Western Pennsylvania in Pittsburgh, now known as the Senator John Heinz History Center. The collection includes 17 linear feet of materials and is known as the Holland Collection.

== Taxon named in his honor ==
The fish Spinibarbus hollandi Ōshima 1919 was named to honor Holland, who was Director of the Carnegie Museum, in whose journal Ōshima's paper appeared.

== Literature ==
- Alberts, Robert C. (1987). Pitt: The Story of the University of Pittsburgh 1787–1987. Pittsburgh: University of Pittsburgh Press. ISBN 0-8229-1150-7.
- Holland, W. J. (1898). The butterfly book : a popular guide to a knowledge of the butterflies of North America. New York: Doubleday & McClure. (Reprinted by Dover.) Text at Project Gutenberg.
- Holland, W. J. (1903). The moth book a popular guide to a knowledge of the moths of North America. New York: Doubleday, Page & company.
- Holland, W. J. (1913). To the River Plate and Back: The Narrative of a Scientific Mission to South America, with Observations on Things Seen and Suggested . New York & London: G. P. Putnam's Sons. (on-line)
- "William Jacob Holland" in American National Biography. New York: Oxford University Press, 2004.

Preceded by Milton Goff	University of Pittsburgh Chancellor; 1891–1901	Succeeded by Samuel McCormick
