= Brady Street Bridge =

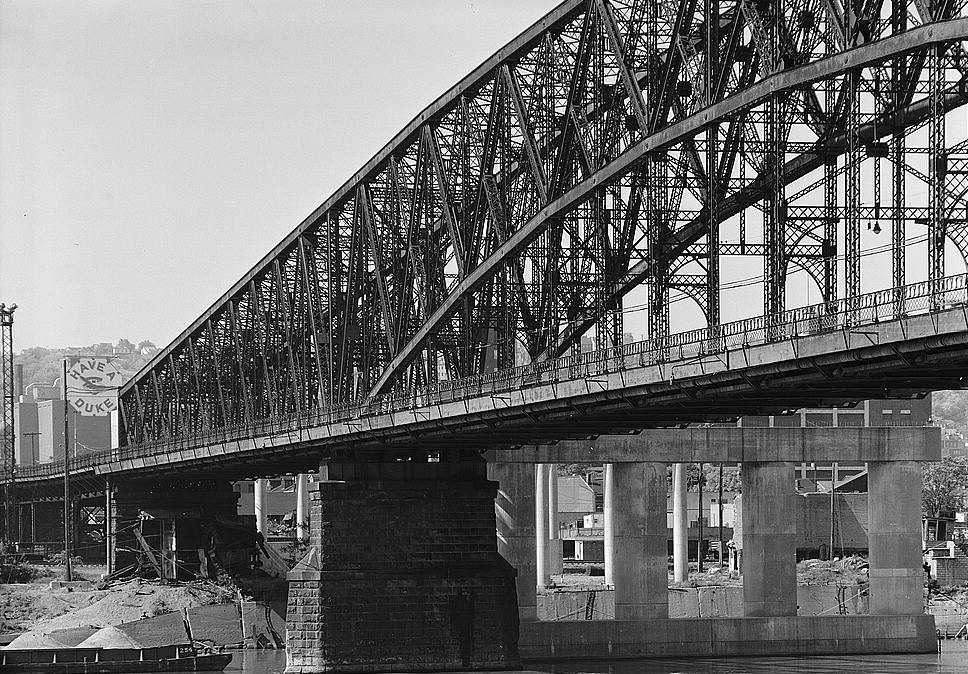
- 1974 HAER photograph of the Brady Street Bridge
- Coordinates: 40.4334°N 79.9735°W
- Crosses: Monongahela River
- Locale: Pittsburgh, Pennsylvania

Characteristics
- Design: Steel truss bridge
- Total length: 2,250 feet (690 m)
- Longest span: 520 feet (160 m)

History
- Opened: 1896
- Closed: May 3, 1976

Location
- Interactive map of Brady Street Bridge

The Brady Street Bridge, also known as the South 22nd Street Bridge, was a steel bowstring arch bridge in Pittsburgh, Pennsylvania, which crossed over the Monongahela River at South 22nd Street. Its main span was a tied arch with a suspended road deck, with two through-truss side spans, carrying two traffic lanes between Brady Street on the Pittsburgh side and South 22nd Street on the south side. Approach viaducts were built at either end. The bridge was built by the Schultz Bridge and Iron Company.

The Brady Street Bridge closed on May 3, 1976, but the new Birmingham Bridge was still being constructed and would not be open for another 14 months. Over two years later on May 29, 1978, the old bridge span was blasted into the Monongahela River. During the cleanup process that followed, railings from its remains were rescued by the Pittsburgh History and Landmarks Foundation and utilized in the construction of the Station Square station.
