= Forbes Avenue =

Street in Pittsburgh, Pennsylvania

Coordinates: 40.44439°N 79.94891°W

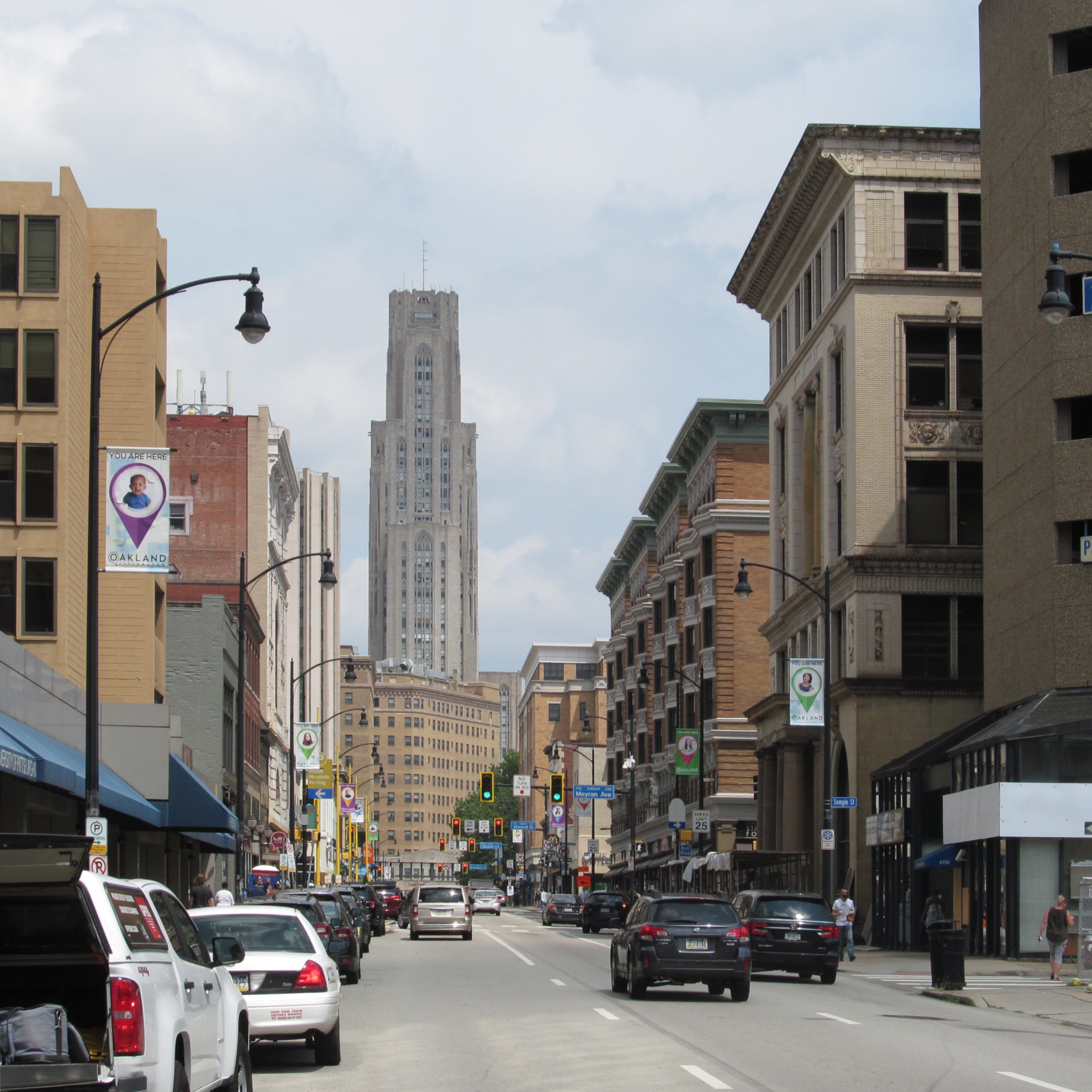
- Forbes Avenue in the Oakland neighborhood in Pittsburgh with the Cathedral of Learning in the background
- Interactive map of Forbes Avenue
- Length: 7 mi (11 km)
- Location: Pittsburgh, Pennsylvania
- West end: Stanwix Street in Downtown
- Major junctions: Market Street in Downtown/Market Square; Grant Street in Downtown; PA 885 (Boulevard of the Allies) in Uptown; Birmingham Bridge in Uptown
- East end: Peebles Street in Point Breeze
- North: Fifth Avenue
- South: Fourth Avenue

Forbes Avenue is one of the longest streets in Pittsburgh, Pennsylvania, United States. It runs along an east–west route for a length of approximately 7 mi (11 km).

== History ==
According to historical writer and blogger Leon J. Pollom, the lowest section of Forbes Avenue was originally named Diamond Street. The remainder was named Forbes Street in honor of John Forbes (1707–1759), whose expedition recaptured Fort Duquesne and who renamed the place Pittsburgh in 1758. In 1958 during the administration of Mayor David L. Lawrence, Diamond Street and Forbes Street were renamed and combined as Forbes Avenue.

In the past, a portion of what is now Forbes Avenue carried U.S. Routes 22 and 30.

=== Fern Hollow Bridge collapse ===
At approximately 6:45 AM EST on January 28, 2022, the Fern Hollow Bridge carrying Forbes Avenue over Fern Hollow Creek in Frick Park collapsed, injuring ten; the bridge was just west of the intersection with Briarcliff Road. Six vehicles were left trapped in the rubble, including a Port Authority articulated bus. The three-span steel rigid-frame bridge, completed in 1973, was 446.9 ft (136.2 m) long and had been listed by the National Bridge Inventory as being in poor condition since September 2011.

The collapse ruptured a 16-inch (41 cm) natural gas pipeline under the bridge, causing a "massive" leak that was isolated quickly by Peoples Natural Gas.

== Route ==
The buildings that stand along Forbes Avenue are a mixture of old and new. The westernmost terminus of Forbes Avenue lies at Stanwix Street in the downtown part of the city. This runs eastward past the recent PPG Place, directly through Market Square and then between the 19th-century Courthouse and the 20th-century City-County Building. Duquesne University, though established in the 19th century, mostly abuts Forbes with some early to mid-20th-century buildings. Some mostly late 19th-century buildings form Forbes's passage through Midtown and the Uptown. In Oakland, it goes through a mixture of late 19th-century stores, and then passes the University of Pittsburgh's Cathedral of Learning (early 20th century) and the late 19th-century Carnegie Library of Pittsburgh. From Oakland, Forbes Avenue continues eastward past 20th- and 21st- century Carnegie Mellon University and late 19th-century Schenley Park, through the small stores of Squirrel Hill, and past Homewood Cemetery and Frick Park before it reaches its eastern terminus at the site of the January 2022 Fern Hollow Bridge collapse.

== Photographs ==
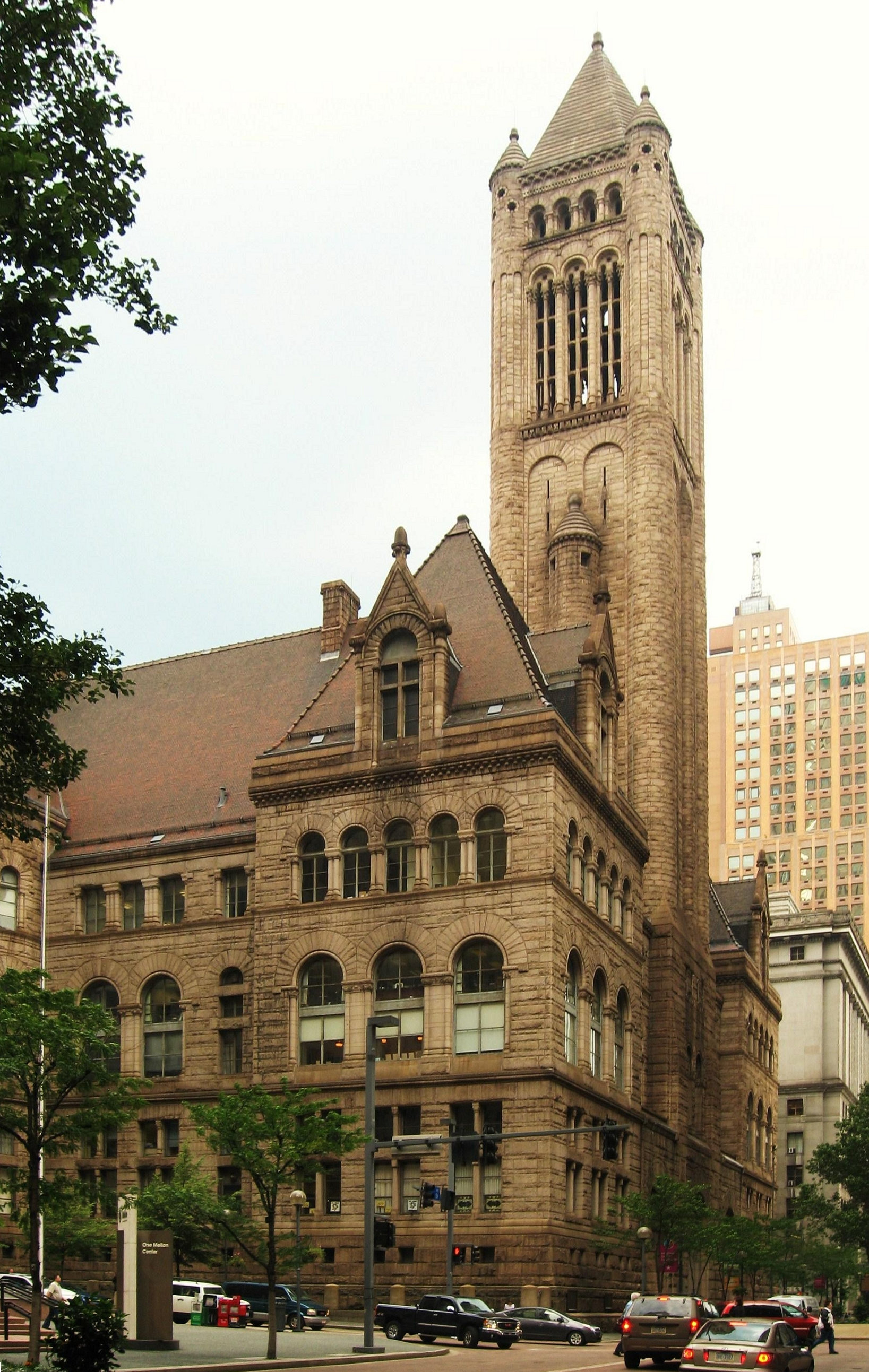
Allegheny County Courthouse, built in 1884, bounded by Forbes and Fifth Avenues, as well as Grant and Ross Streets.

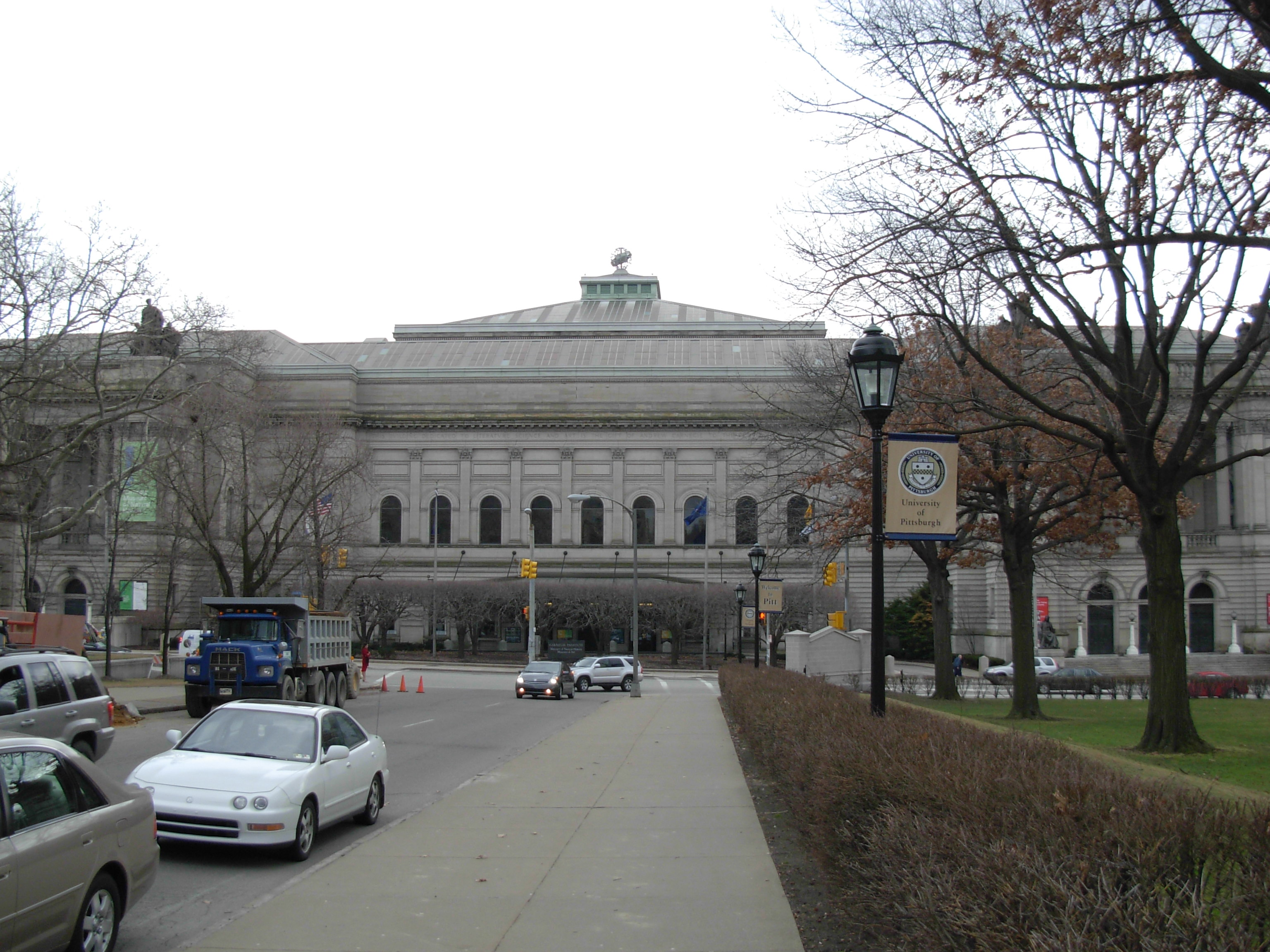
The Carnegie Institute and Library complex (which houses the Carnegie Museum of Natural History, Carnegie Museum of Art, Carnegie Music Hall, and the main branch of the Carnegie Library of Pittsburgh), built in 1896, at 4400 Forbes Avenue.

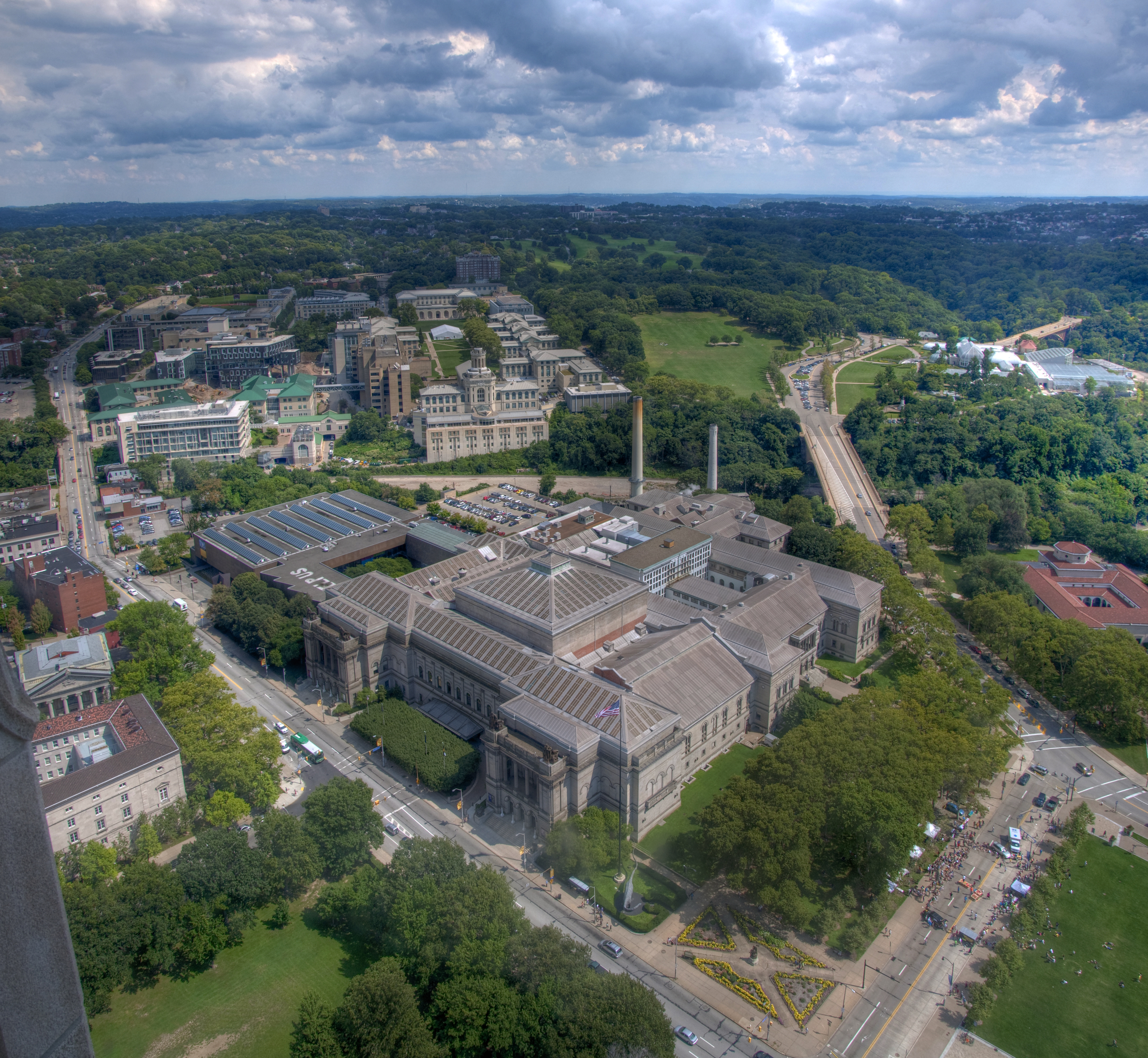
The Carnegie Institute and Library complex on Forbes Avenue, as well as Carnegie Mellon University campus as viewed from the 36th floor of the Cathedral of Learning.

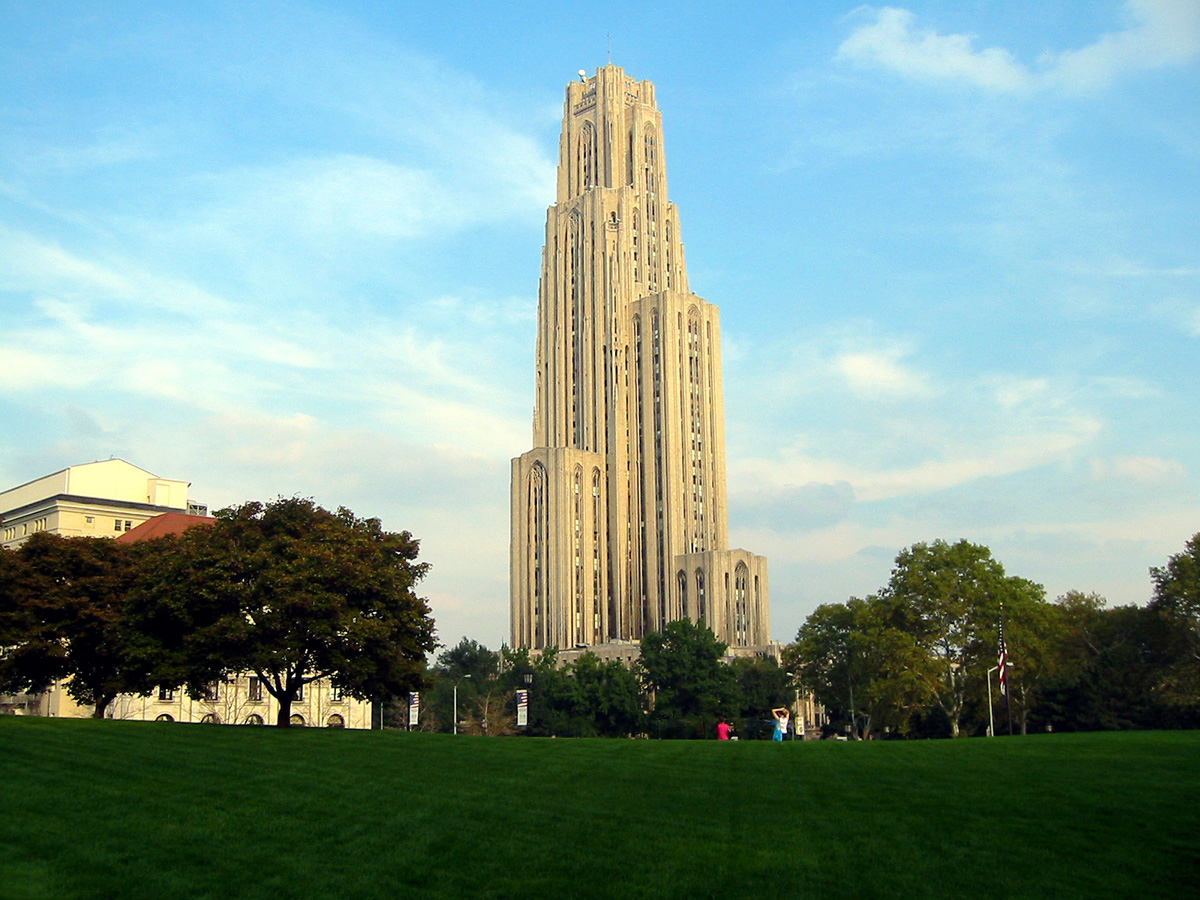
Cathedral of Learning, built in 1926, bounded by Forbes, Fifth, and S. Bellefield Avenues and Bigelow Boulevard. The tallest academic building in the United States.

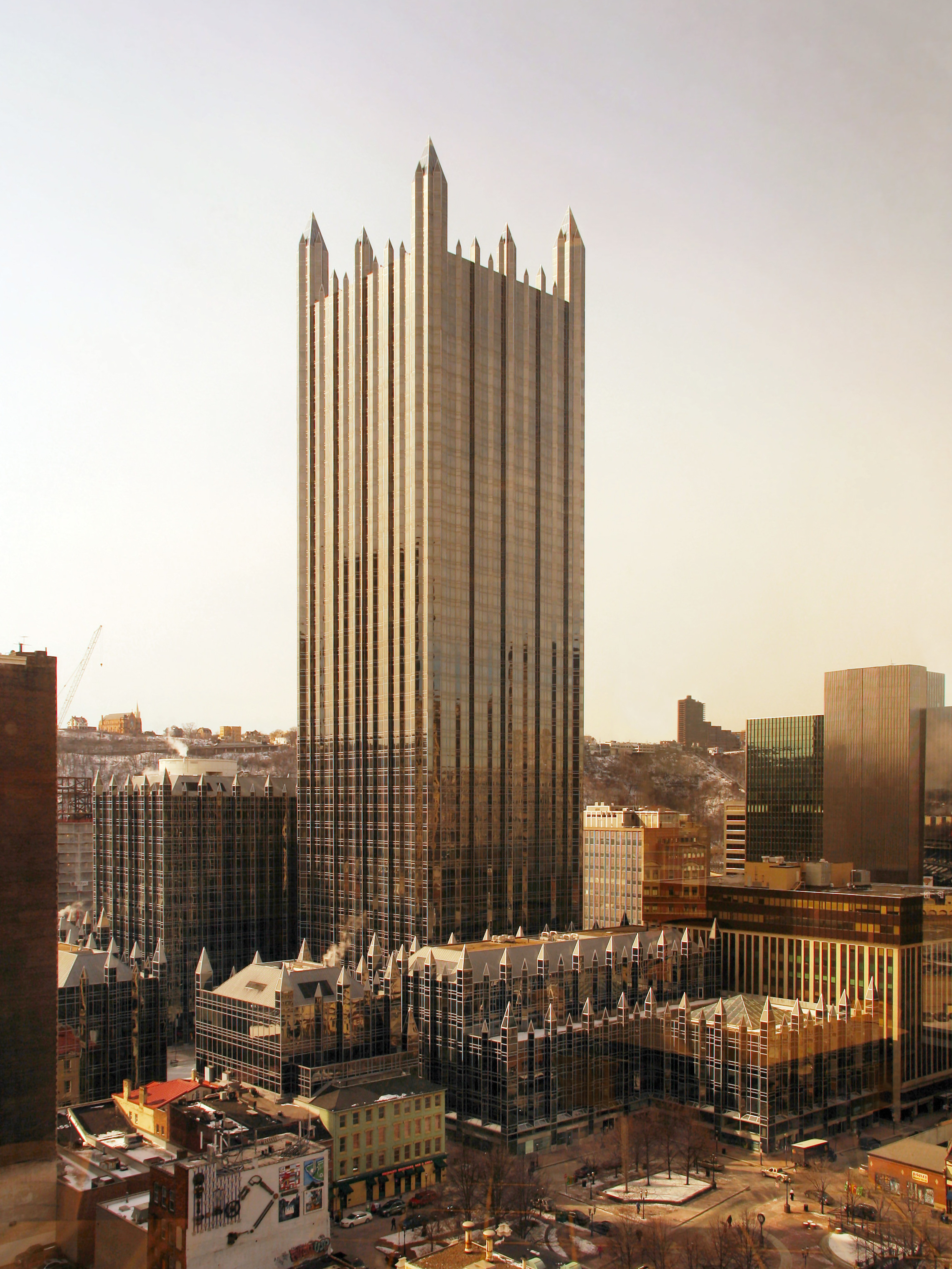
PPG Place, built from 1981 to 1984, bounded by Forbes Avenue and the Boulevard of the Allies on its north and south sides, and Stanwix and Wood Streets to its east and west.

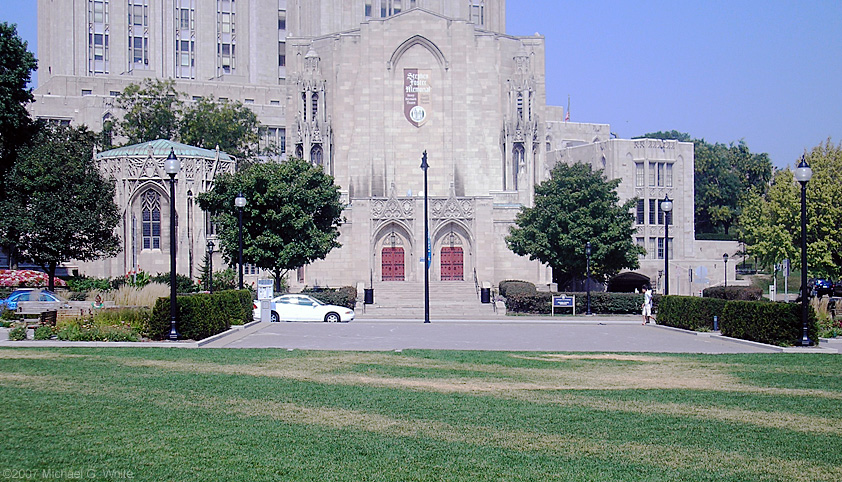
Stephen Foster Memorial, opened in 1937, on Forbes Avenue.

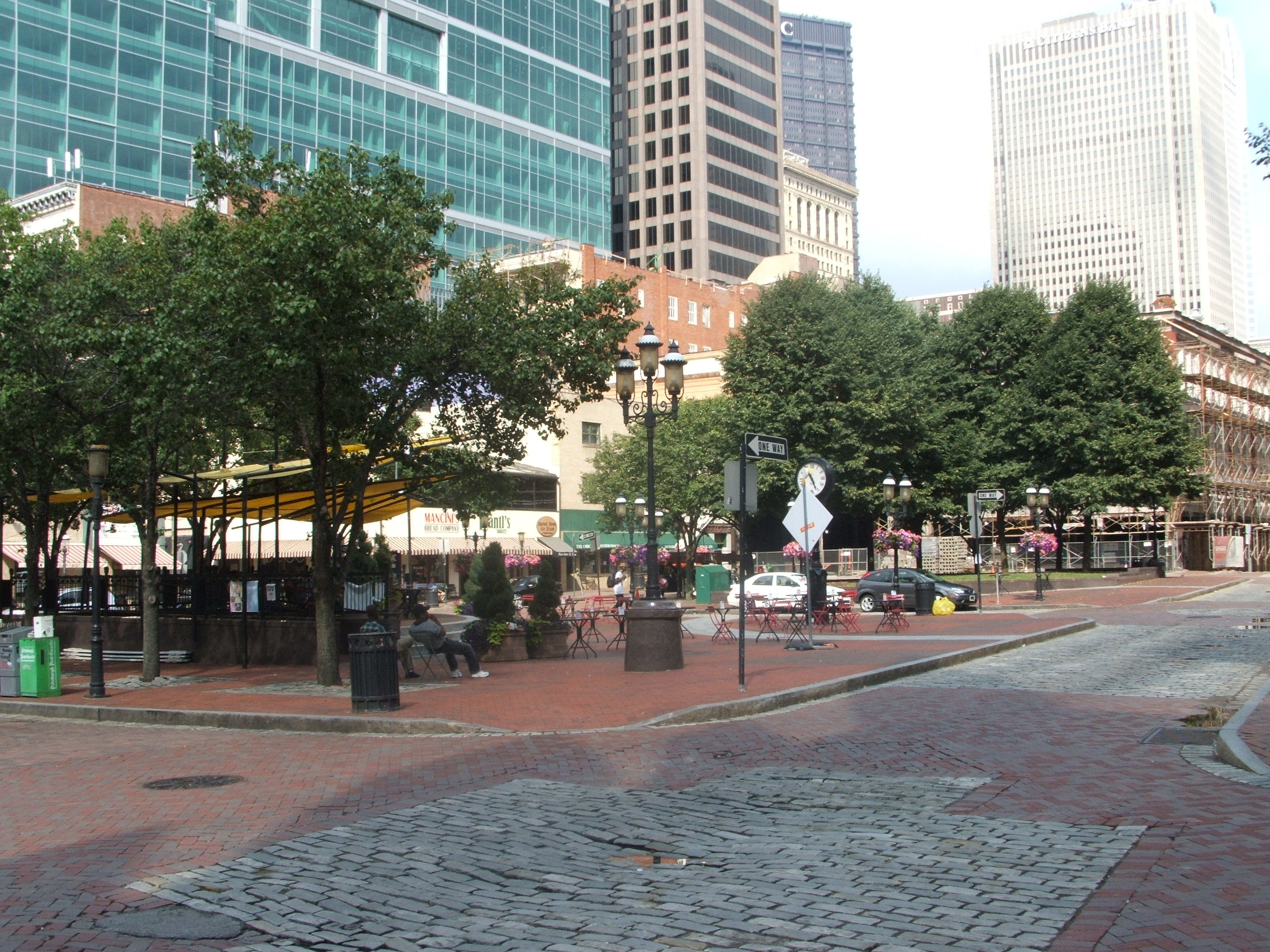
Market Square at the intersection of Forbes Avenue and Market Street in Downtown Pittsburgh.

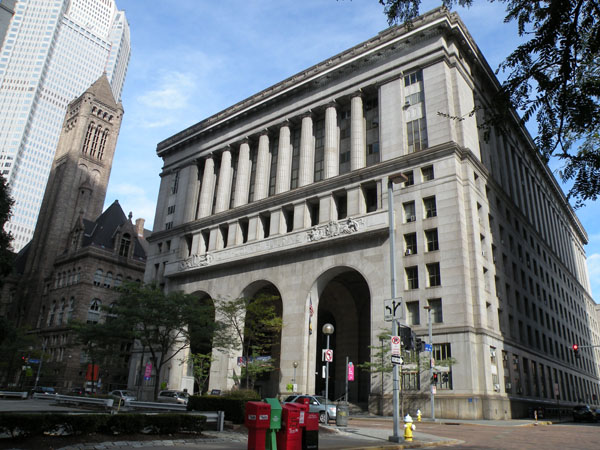
Pittsburgh City-County Building, built in 1915 to 1917, at Grant Street and Forbes Avenue.

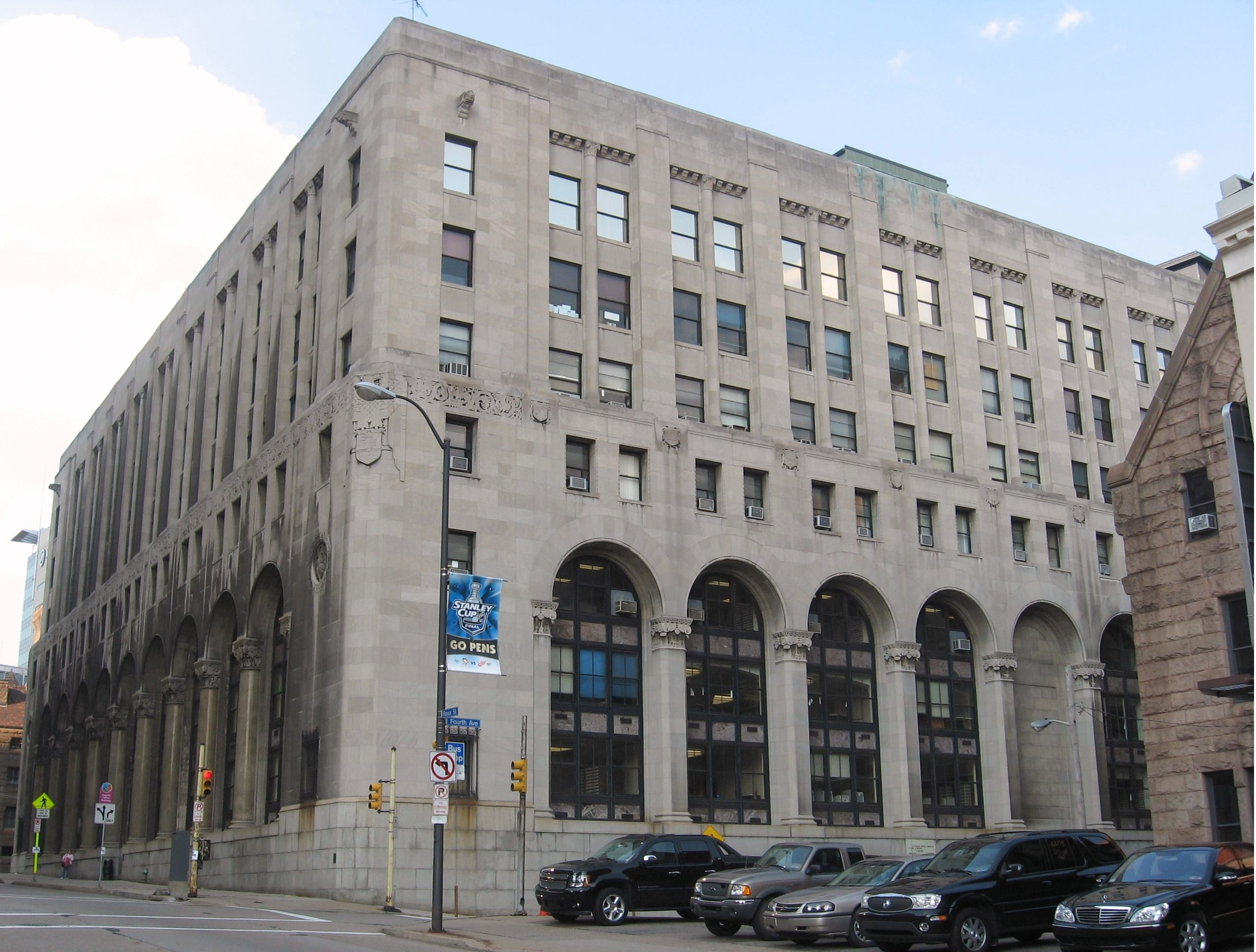
Allegheny County Office Building, built from 1929 to 1931, at Ross Street at Forbes Avenue.

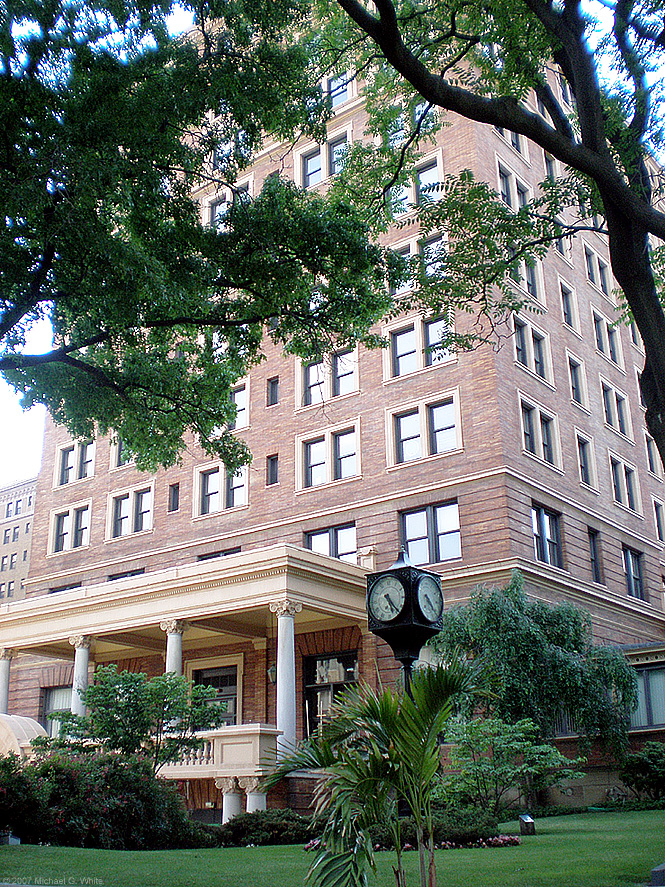
William Pitt Union, the student building of the University of Pittsburgh, built in 1898, as viewed from Forbes Avenue.

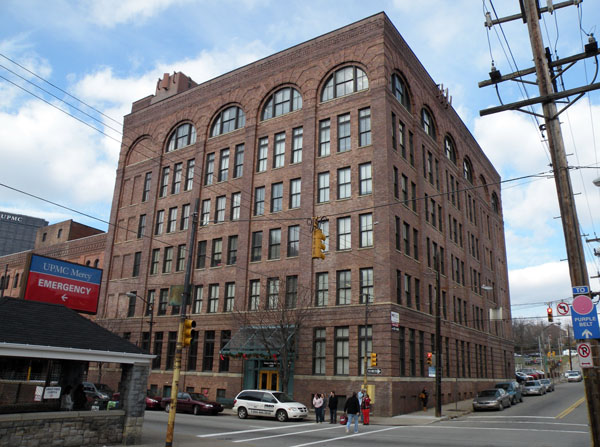
Reymer Brothers Candy Factory, built circa 1910, at 1425 Forbes Avenue.

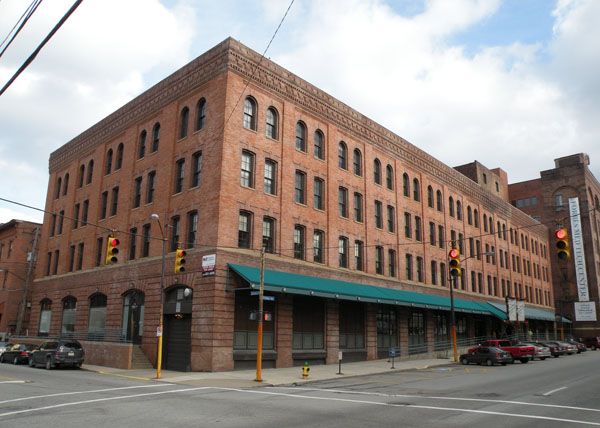
Kaufmann's Department Store Warehouse, built circa 1910, at 1401 Forbes Avenue.

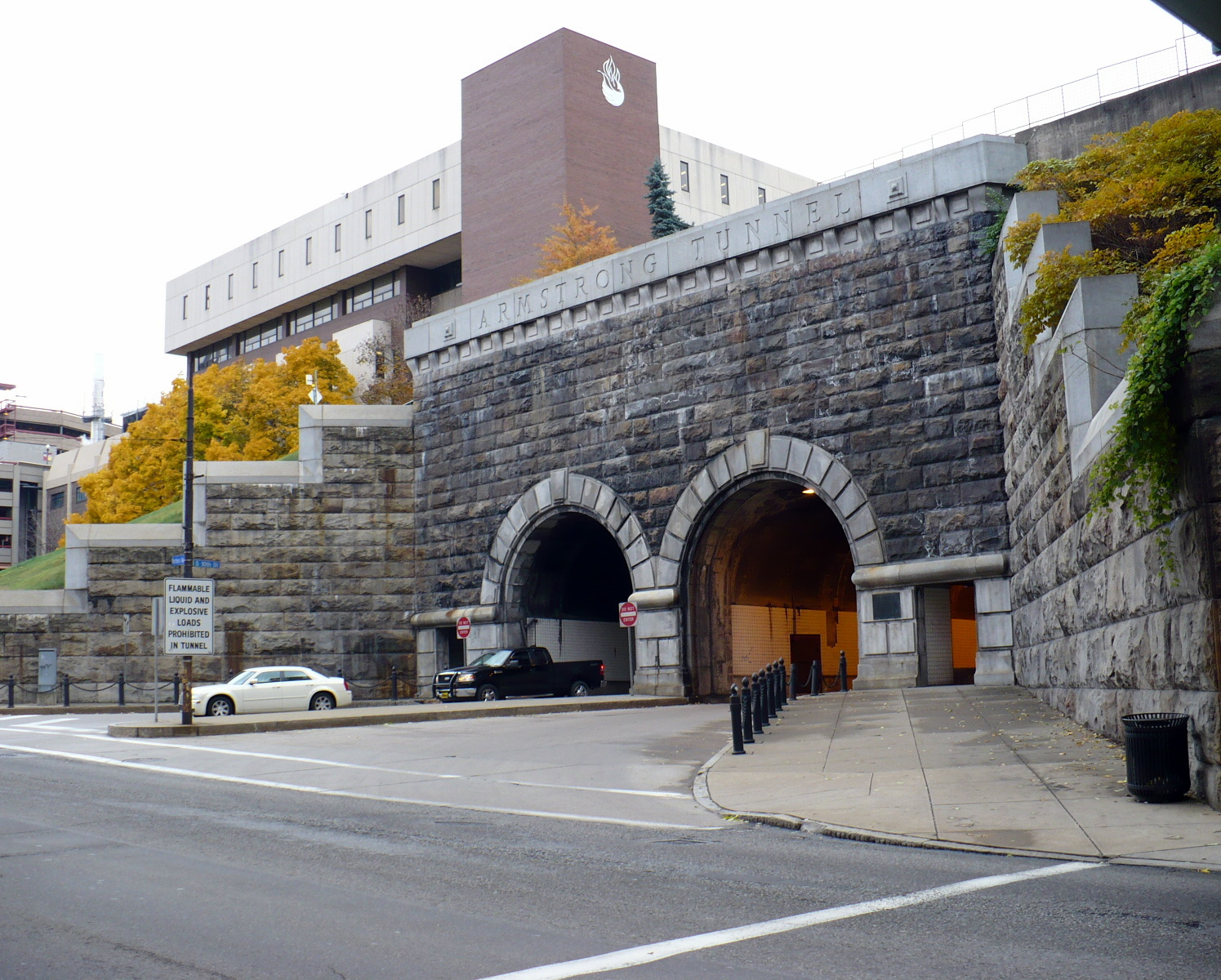
Armstrong Tunnel, built in 1926, between Forbes and 2nd Avenues at S. 10th Street.

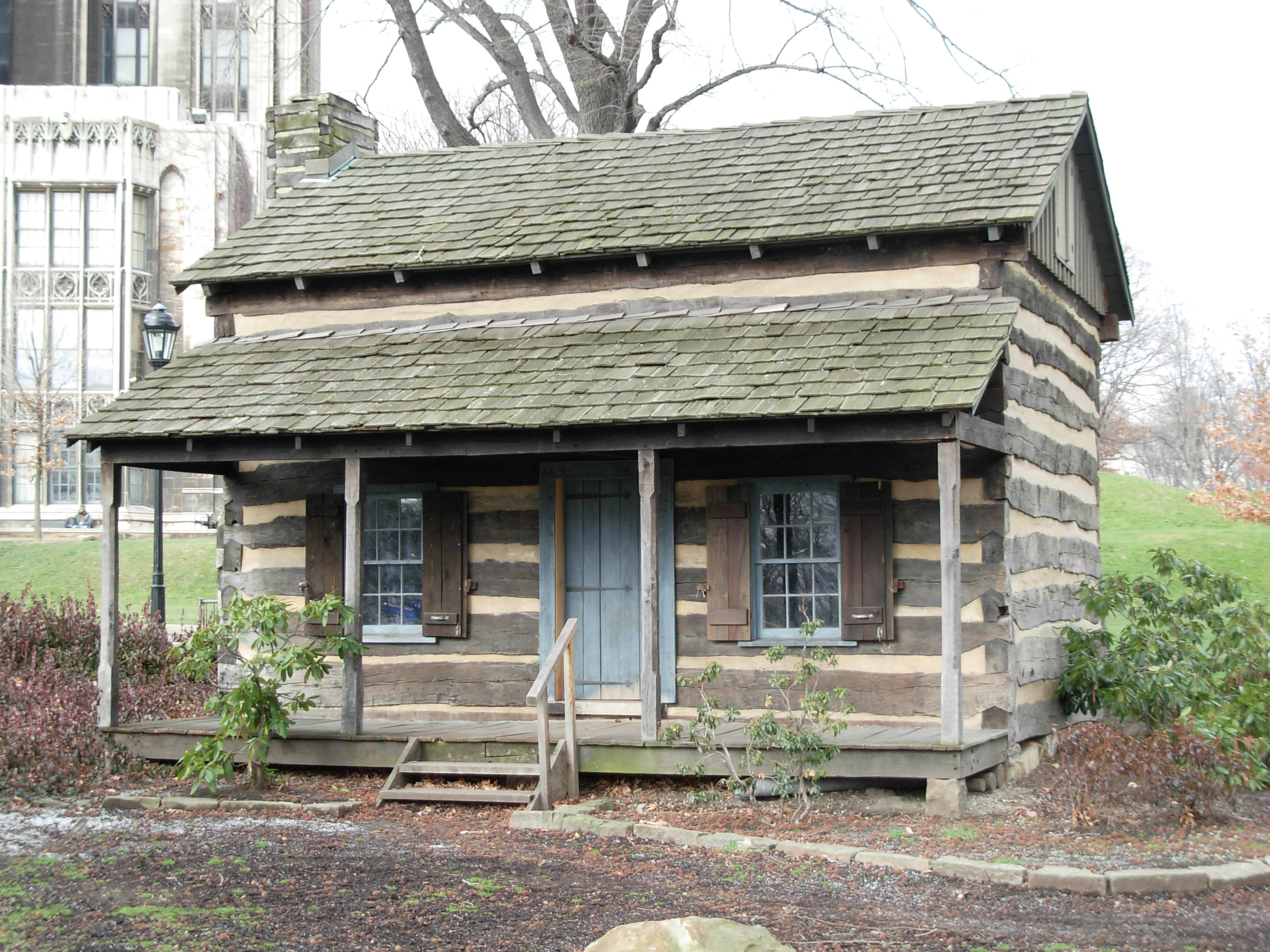
Log Cabin from the 1800s that was placed on the grounds of the Cathedral of Learning facing Forbes Avenue to celebrate Pitt's bicentennial (1987) and log cabin origins.

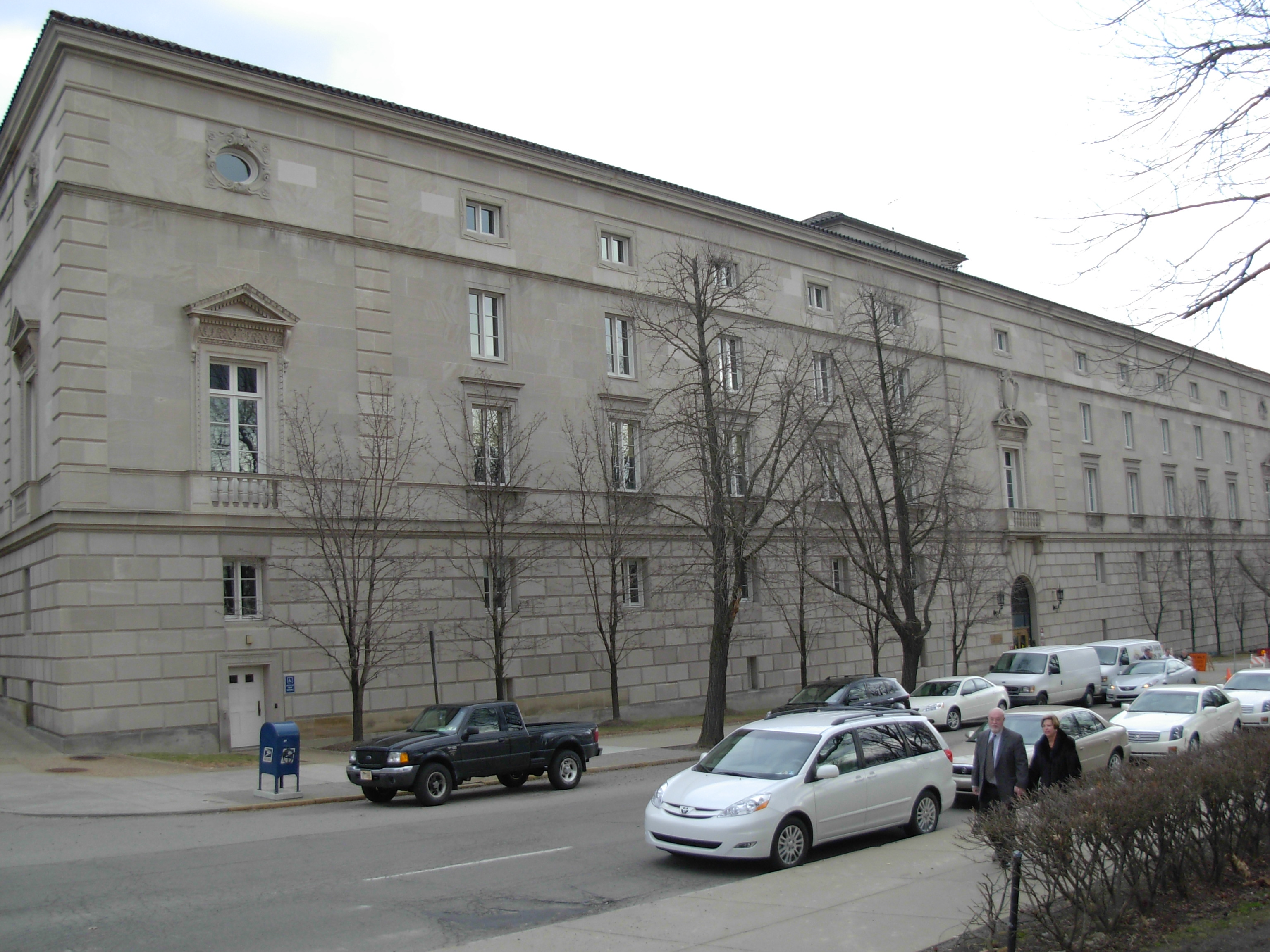
The Pittsburgh Public Schools' Board of Education administration building, bounded by Forbes Ave., S. Bellefield Ave., Filmore and S. Dithridge Streets.

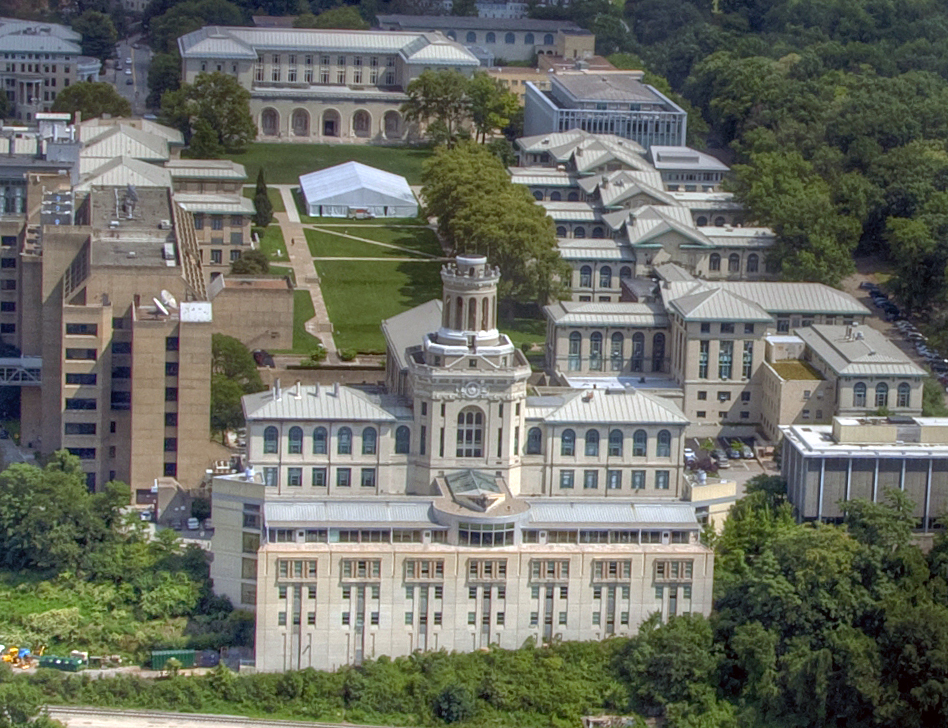
Carnegie Mellon University, buildings from 1905 to 1932.

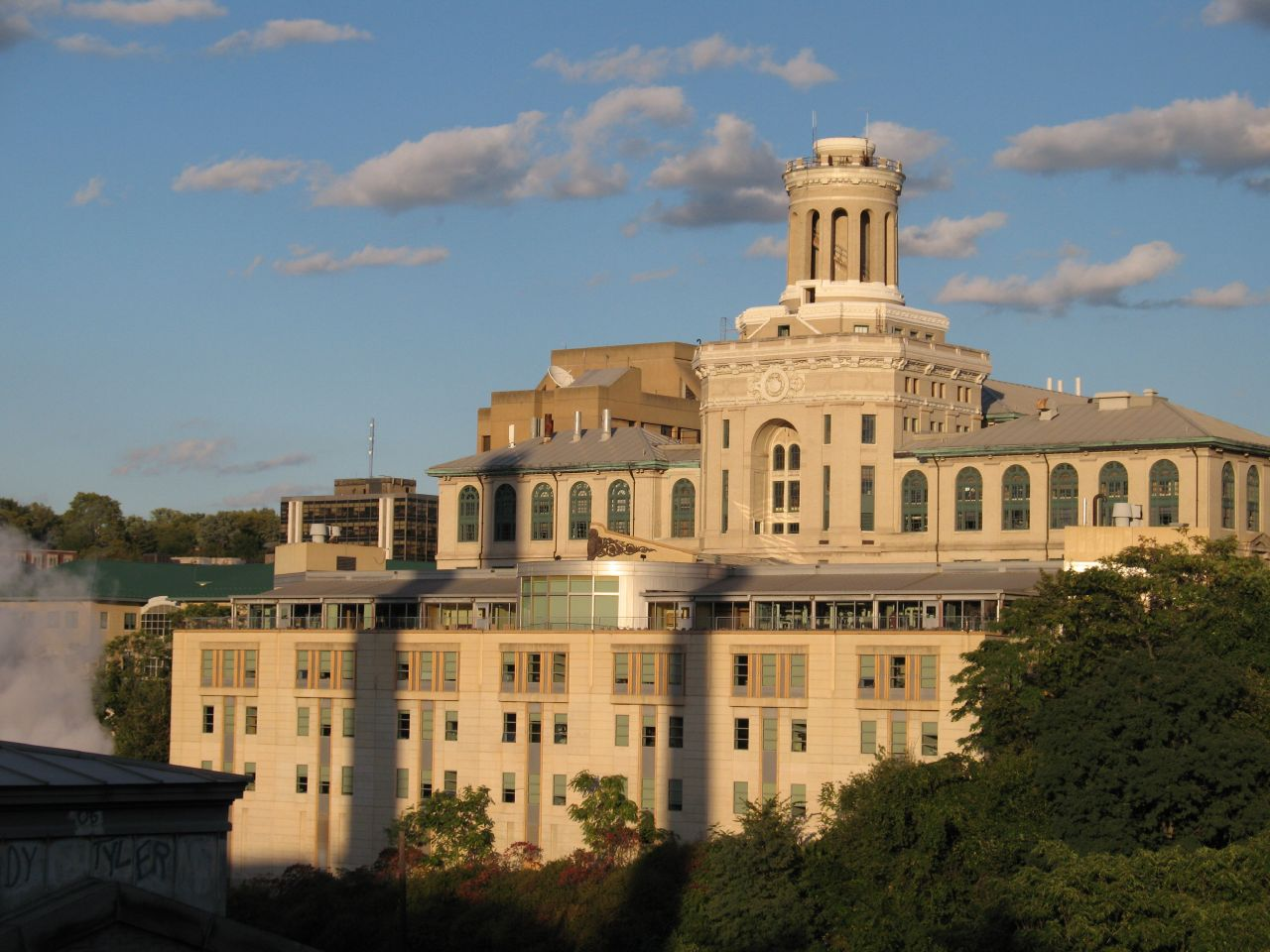
Hamerschlag Hall (Machinery Hall) at Carnegie Mellon, built in 1906 (addition in 1914).

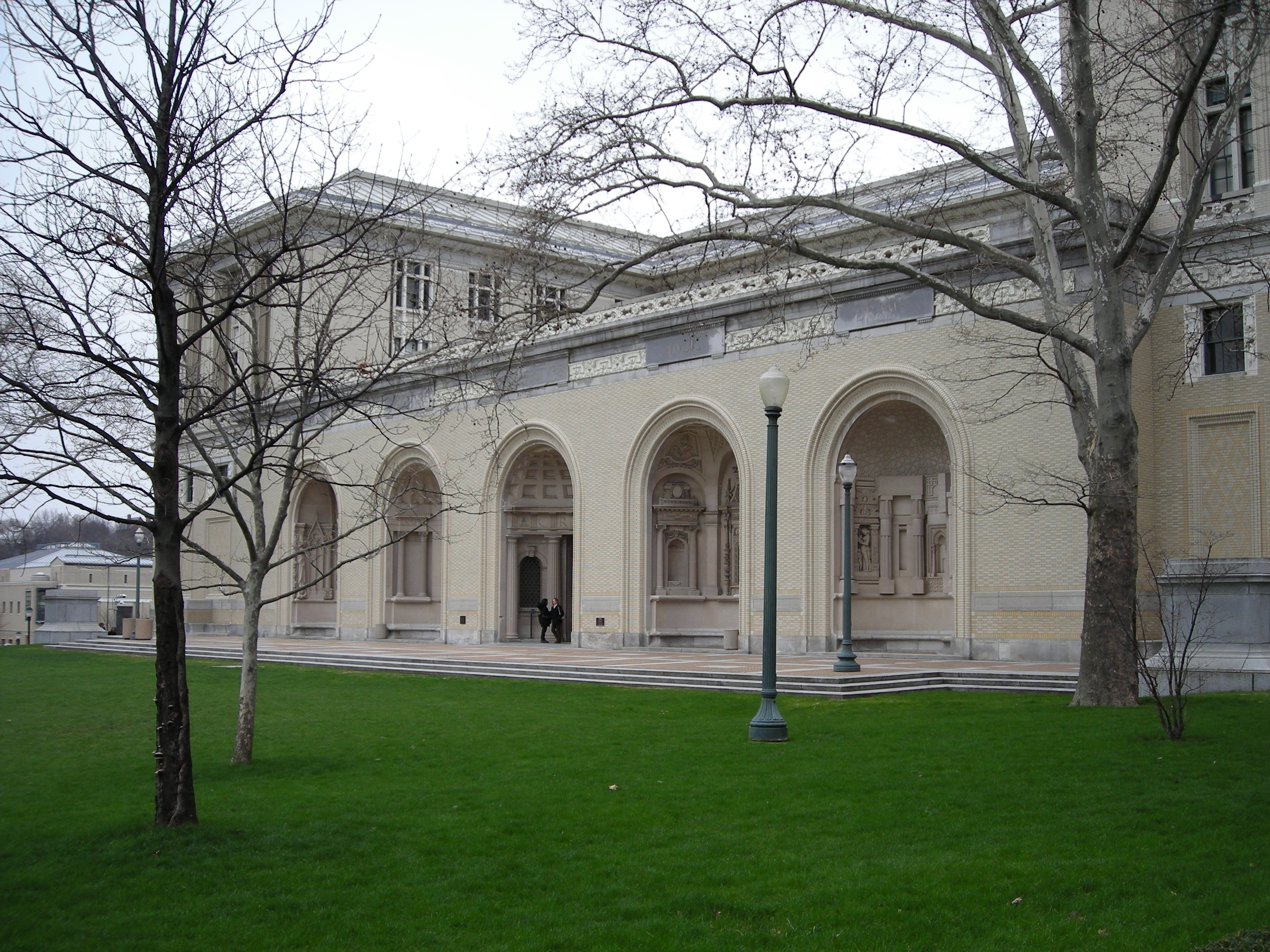
Carnegie Mellon College of Fine Arts at Carnegie Mellon, built in 1912 (addition in 1916).

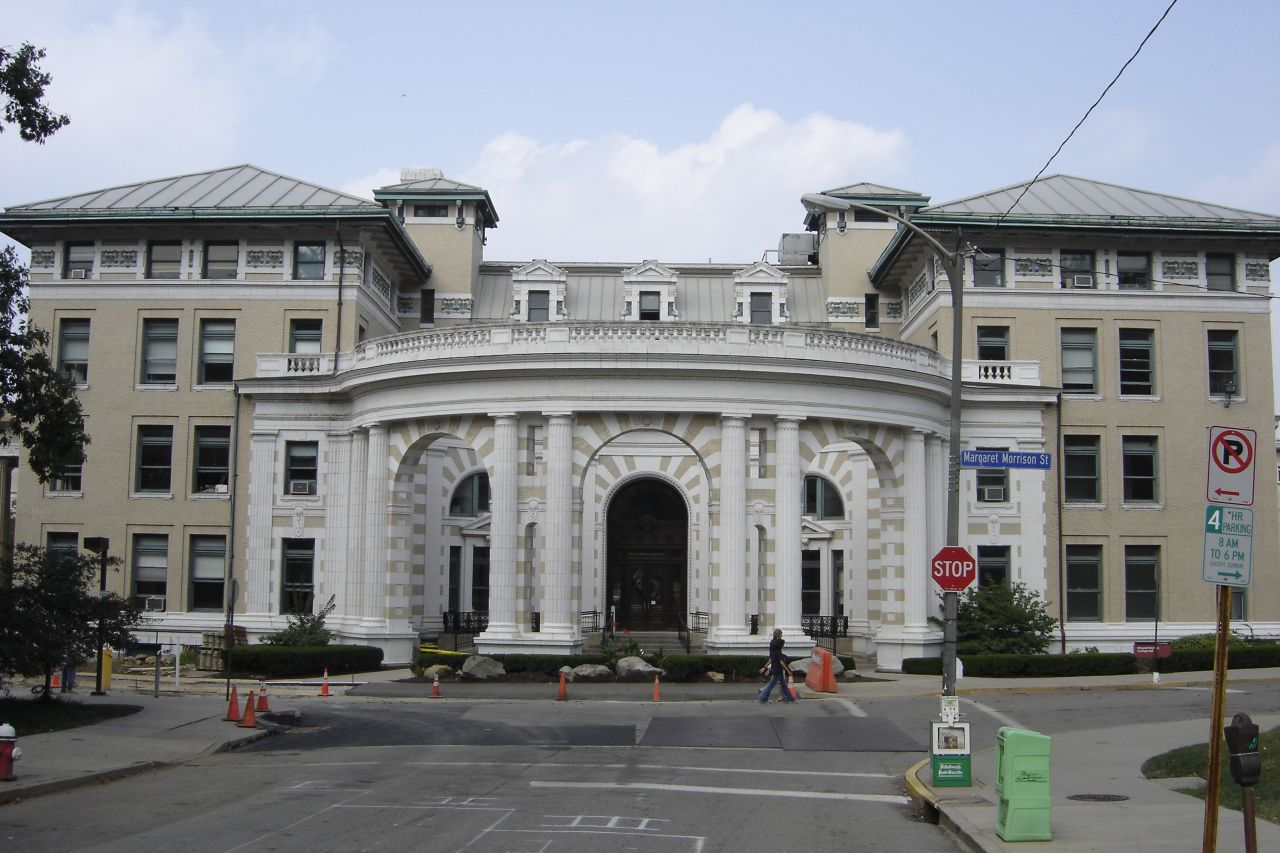
Margaret Morrison Carnegie Hall (Margaret Morrison Carnegie School for Women) of Carnegie Mellon, built in 1906 (addition in 1914).

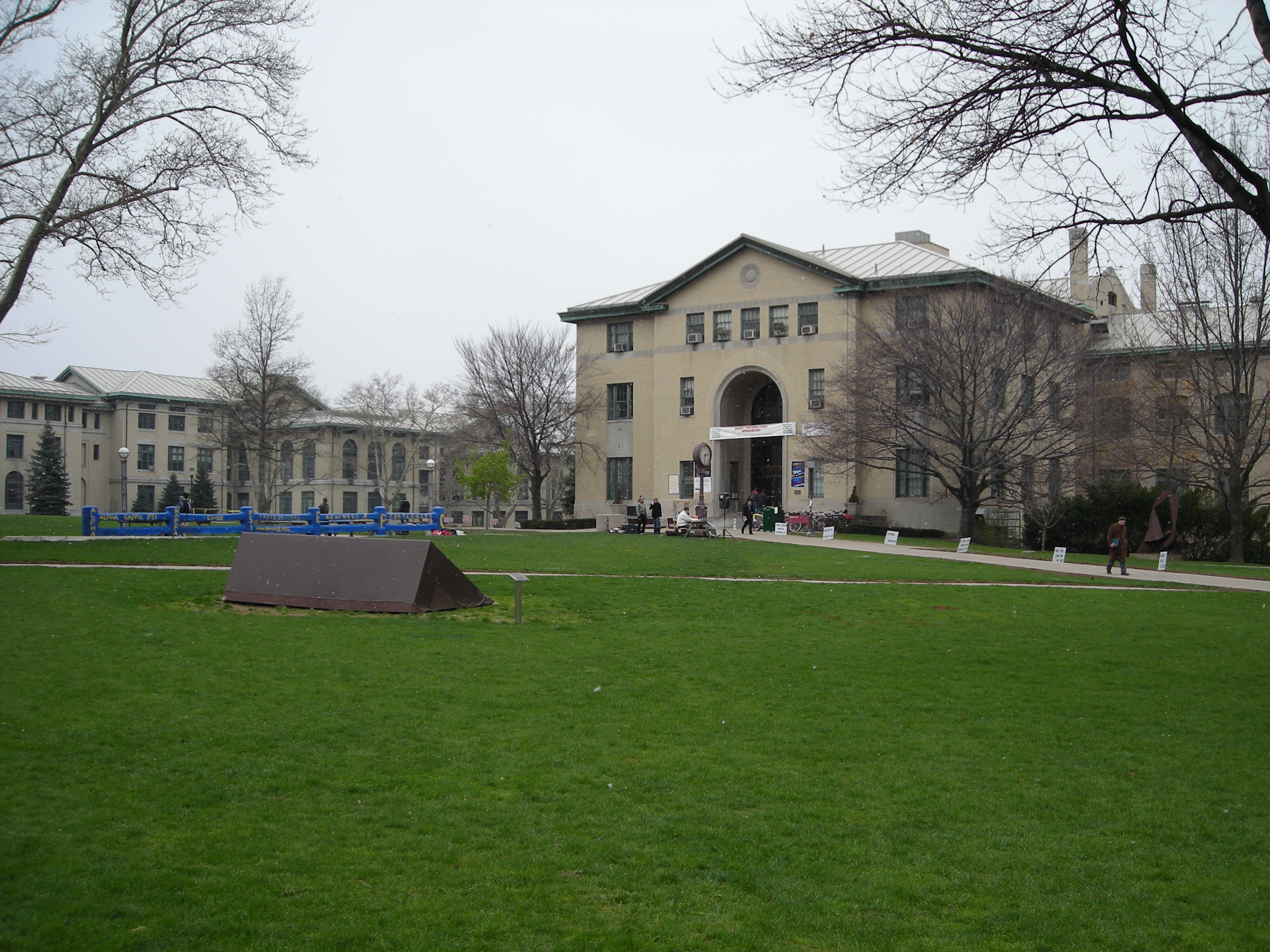
Doherty Hall (School of Applied Sciences, Engineering Hall) of Carnegie Mellon, built in 1908.

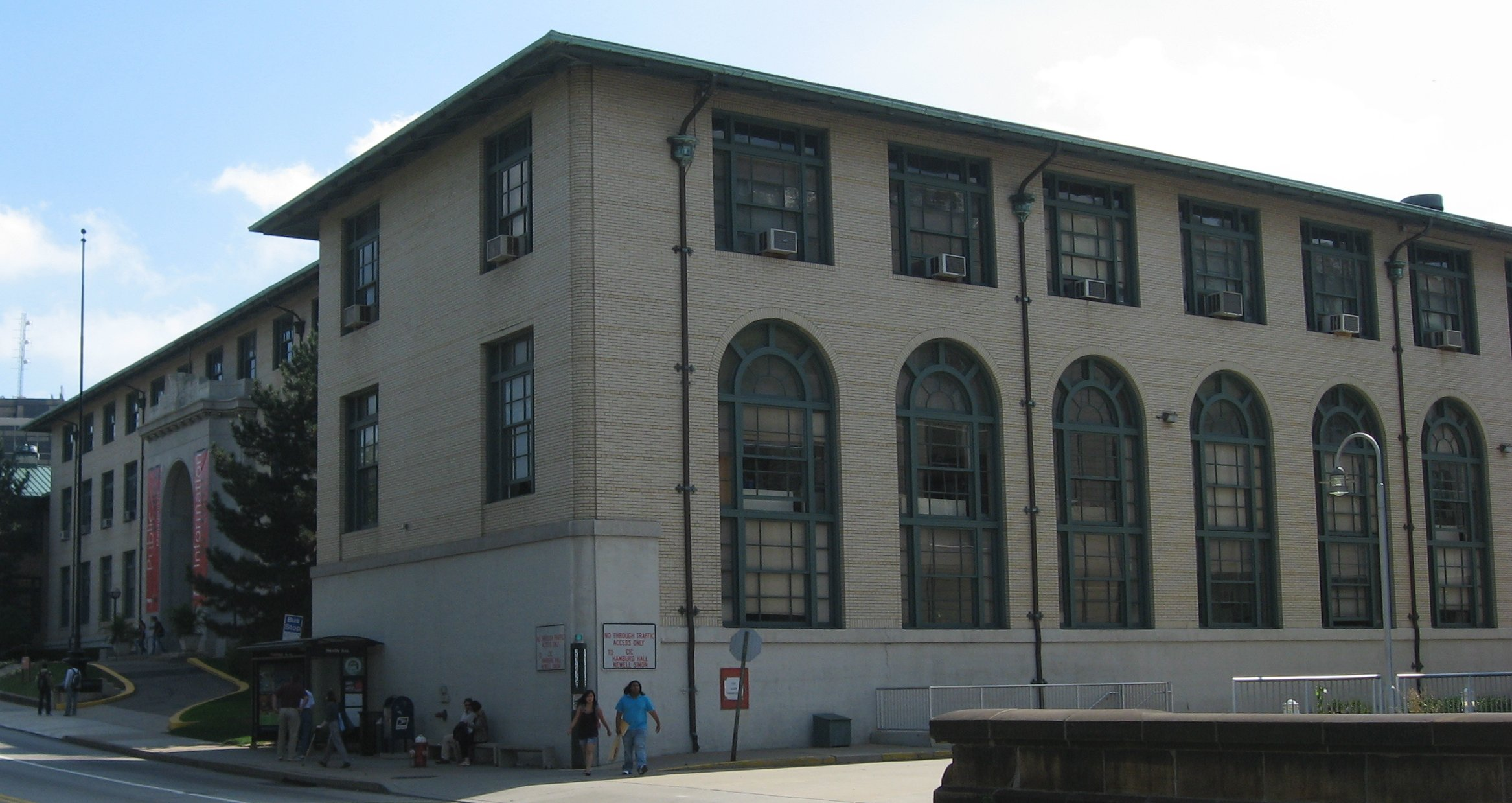
Hamburg Hall on the campus of Carnegie Mellon, former Main Building, U.S. Bureau of Mines, built in 1915, at 4800 Forbes Avenue.

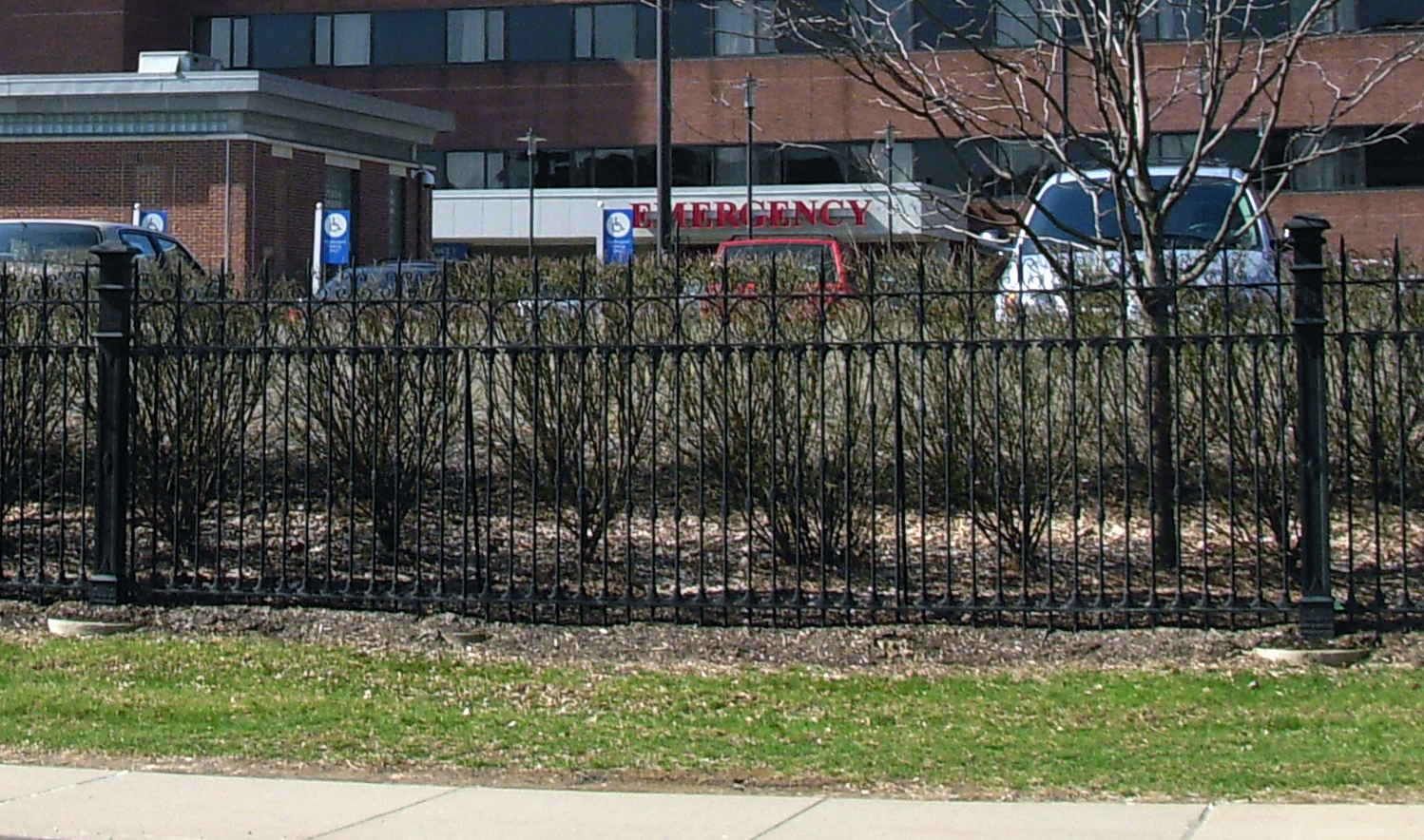
Iron fence from "The Maples" (C. L. Magee estate), built circa 1890, at Forbes Avenue and Halkett Street.

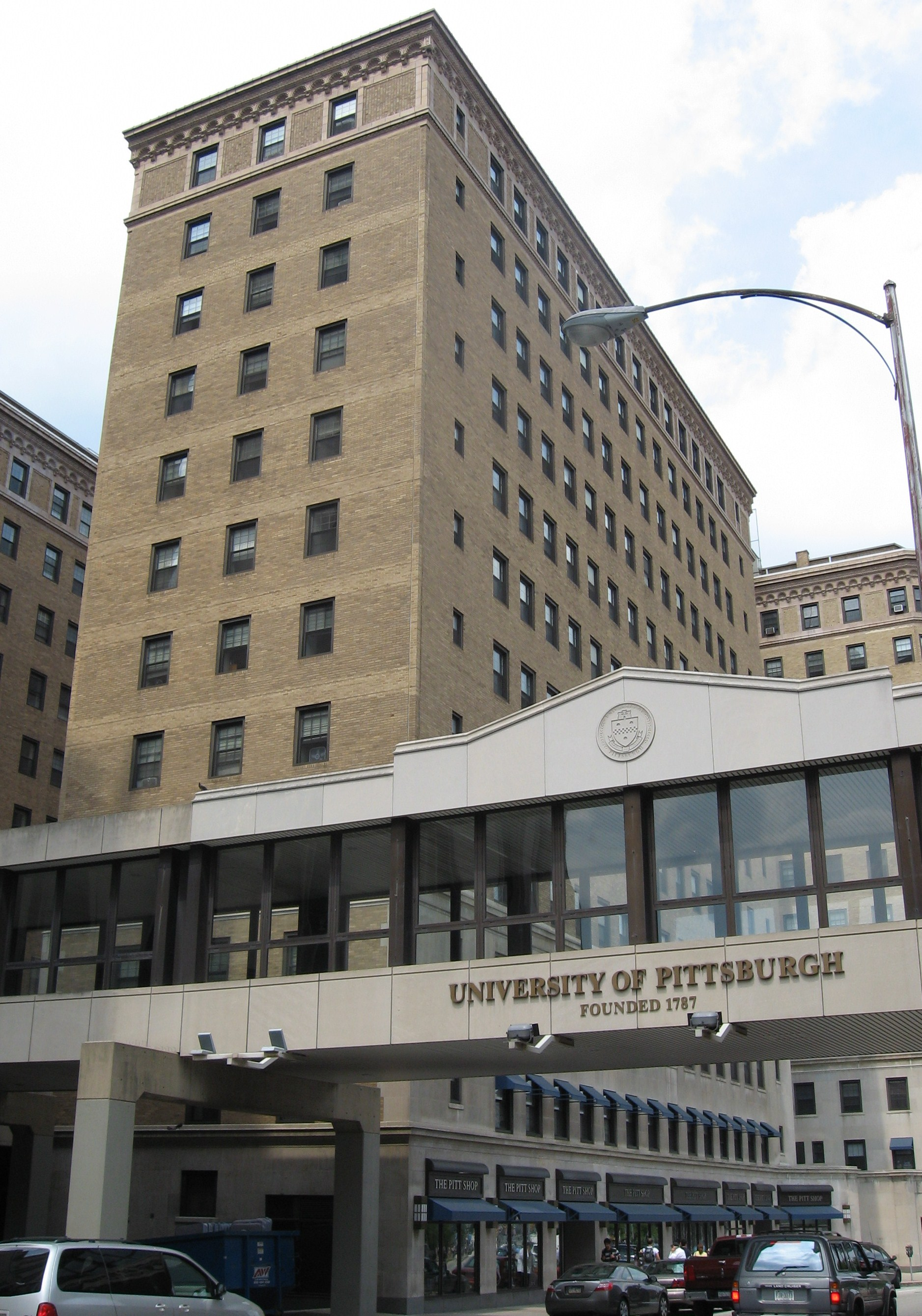
Brackenridge Hall, built in 1924, on Forbes Avenue, part of the Schenley Quadrangle of the University of Pittsburgh.

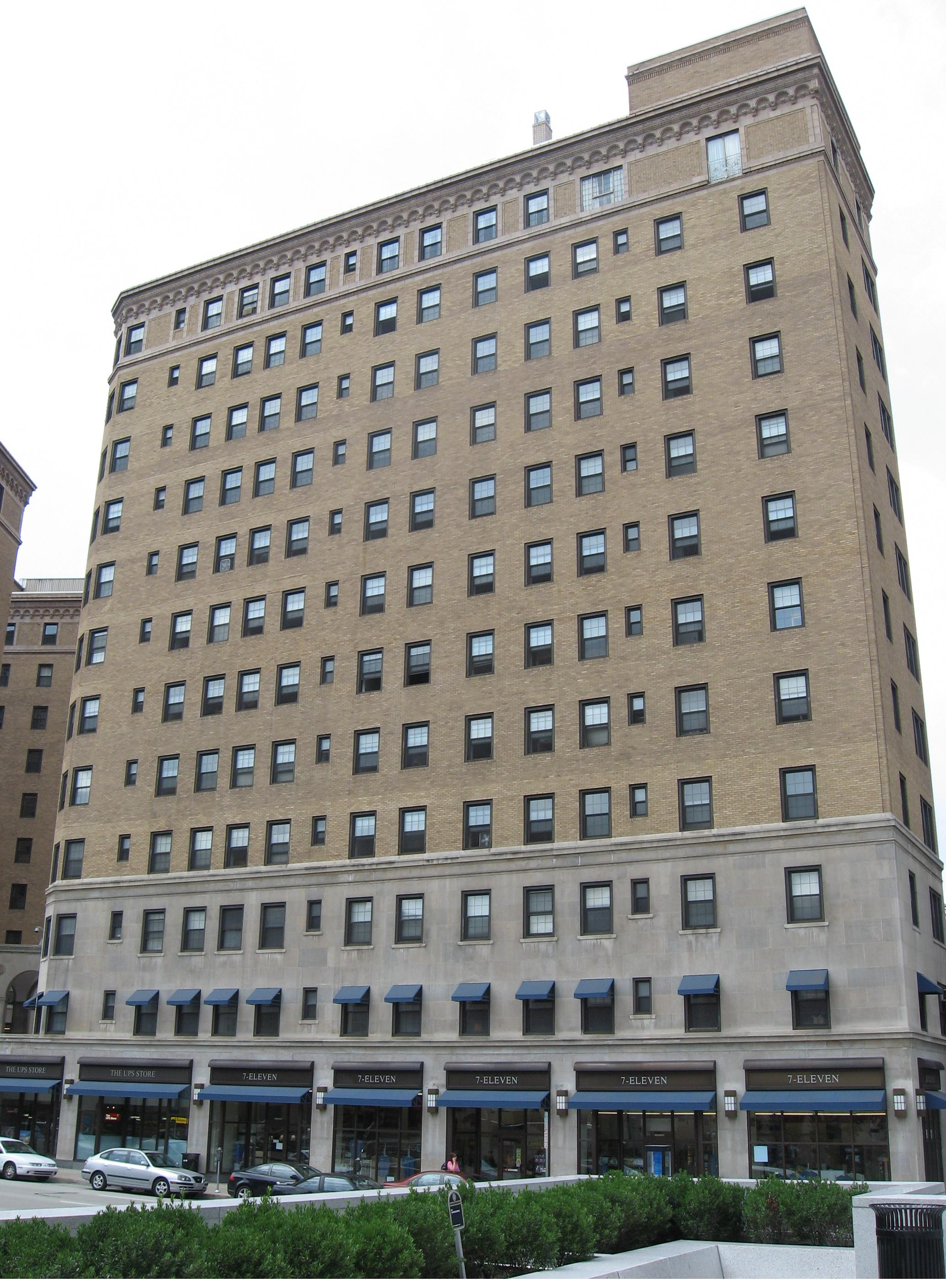
Bruce Hall, built in 1924, on Forbes Avenue, part of the Schenley Quadrangle of the University of Pittsburgh.

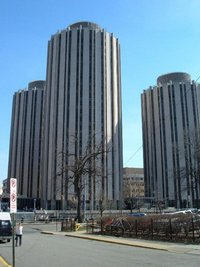
Litchfield Towers, dormitories at the University of Pittsburgh, built in 1963, bounded by Forbes Avenue, 5th Avenue, and Bouquet Street.

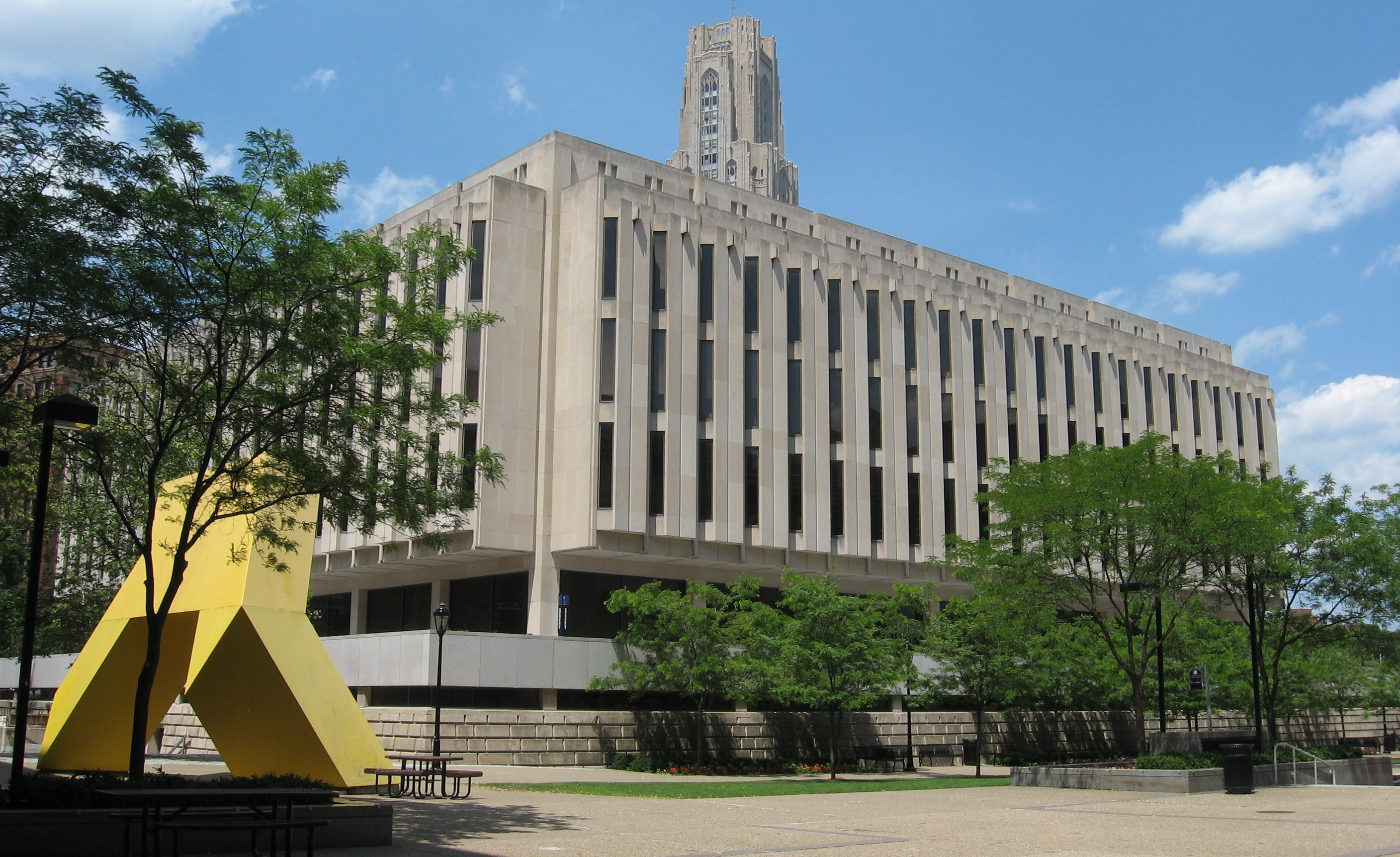
Hillman Library, of the University of Pittsburgh, opened in 1968, at Forbes Avenue and Schenley Drive.

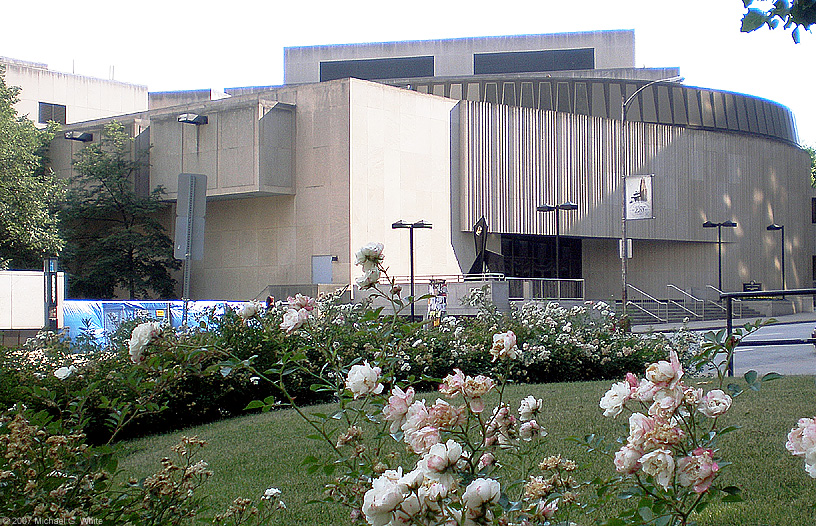
David Lawrence Hall, completed in 1968, an academic building at the University of Pittsburgh, at Forbes Avenue.

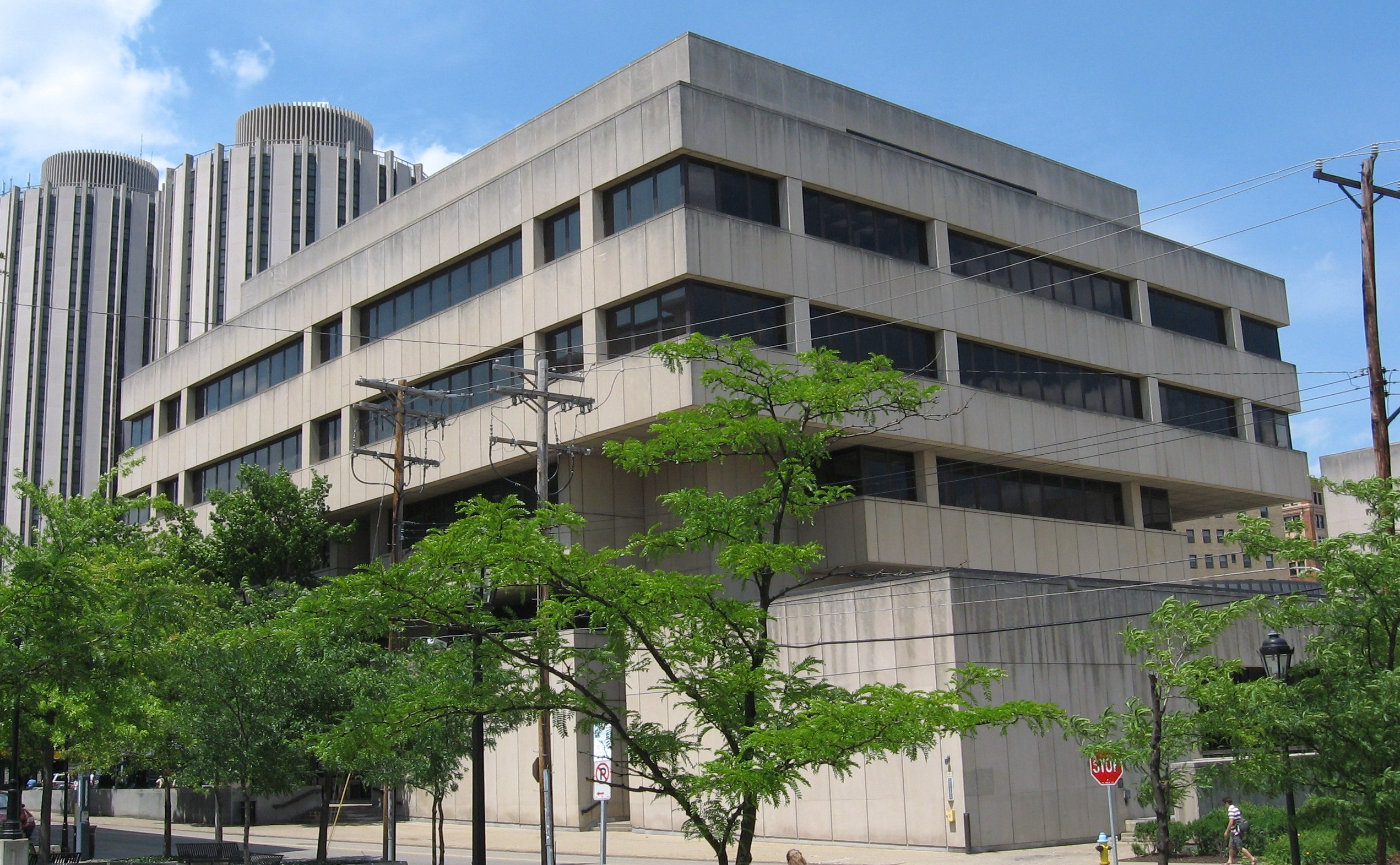
Barco Law Building, opened in 1976, at the corner of Forbes Avenue and S. Bouquet St., houses the University of Pittsburgh's School of Law.

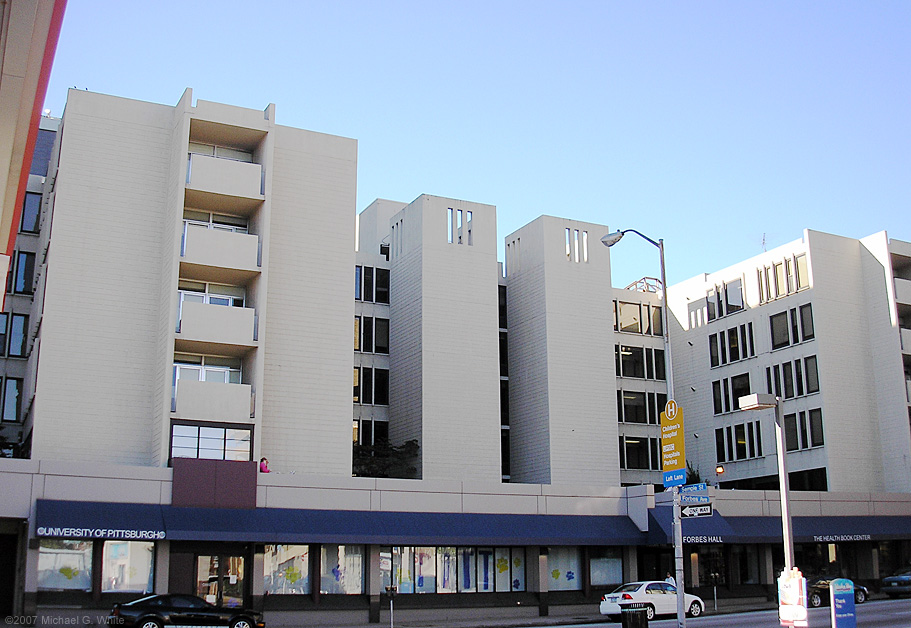
Forbes Hall of the University of Pittsburgh, built in 1965, on Forbes Avenue.

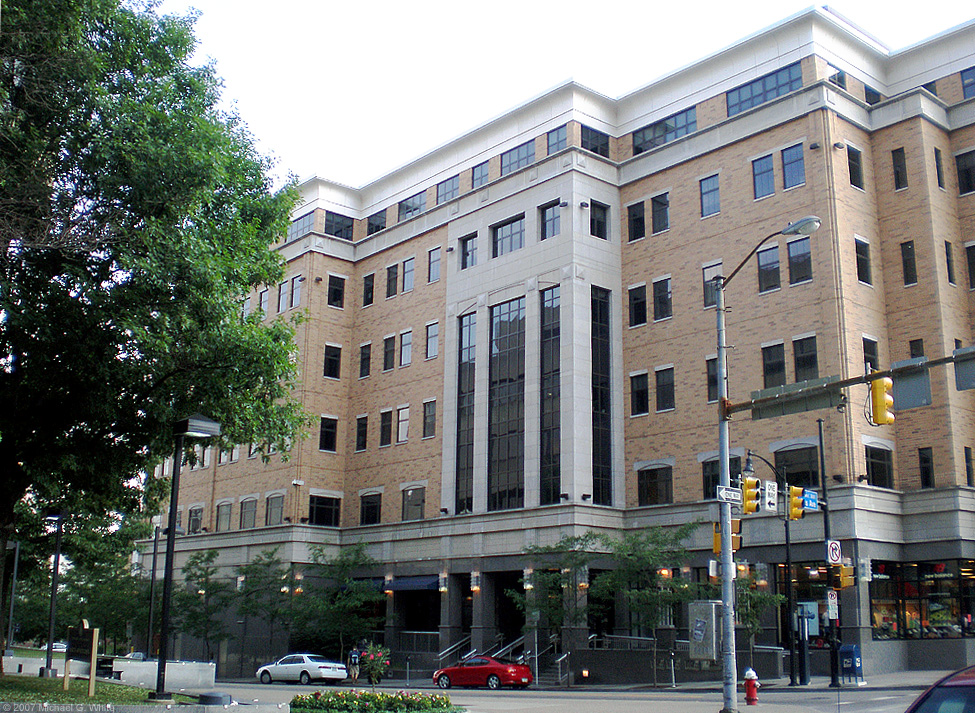
Sennott Square, completed in 2002, part of the University of Pittsburgh, located at Forbes Avenue and S. Bouquet Street.

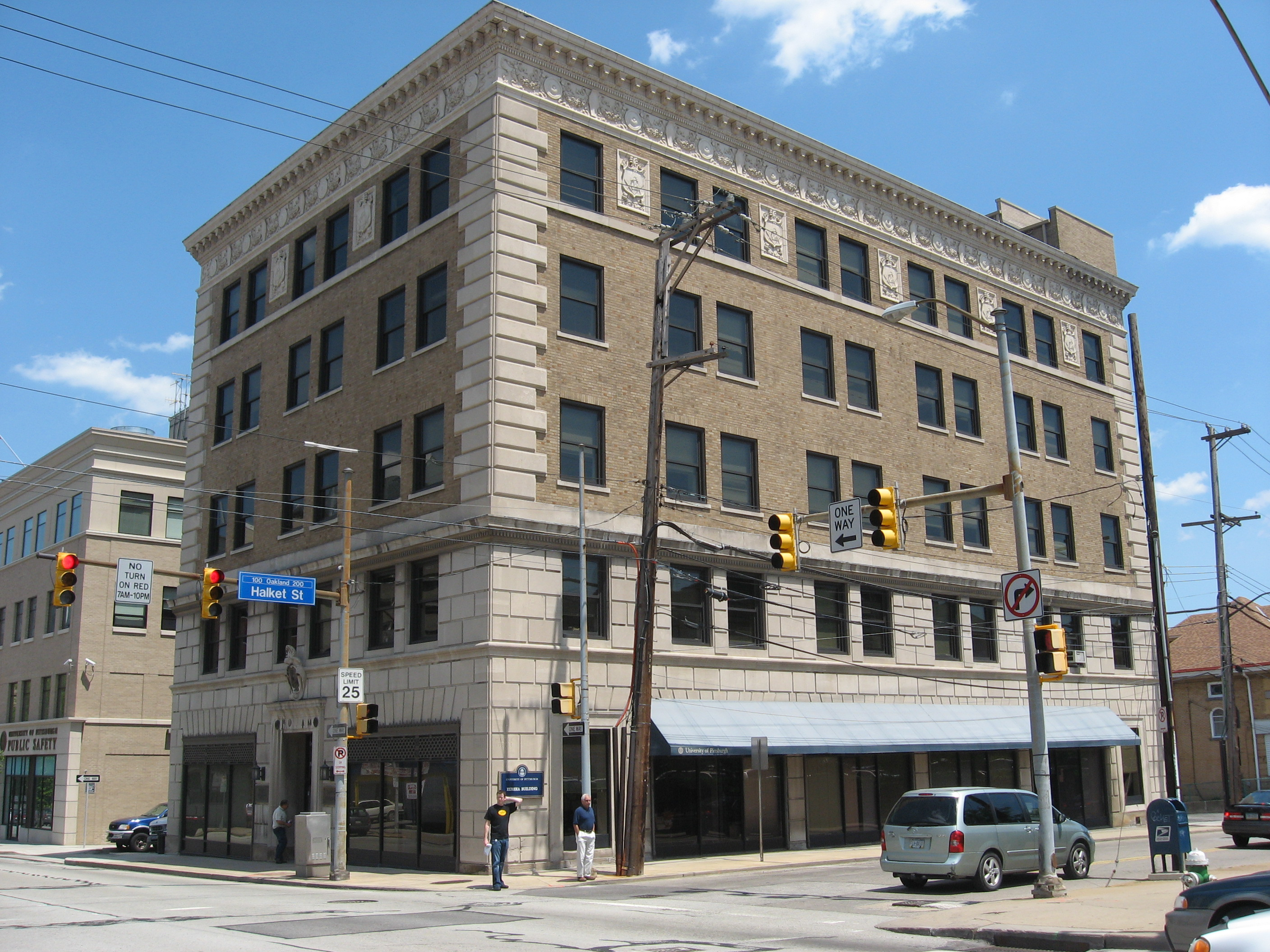
Eureka Building of the University of Pittsburgh, at the corner of Forbes Avenue and Halket Street.

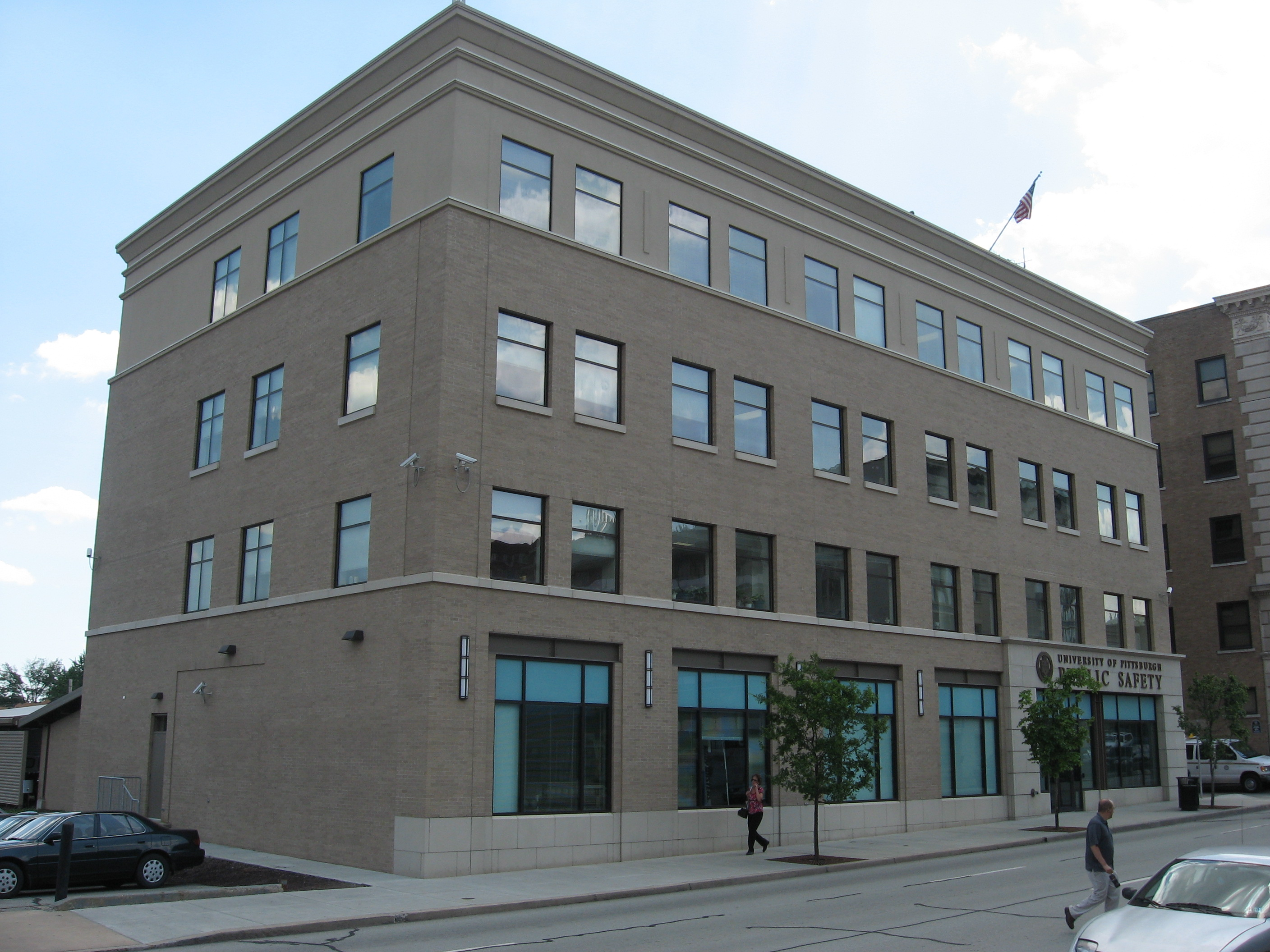
Public Safety Building of the University of Pittsburgh on Forbes Avenue.

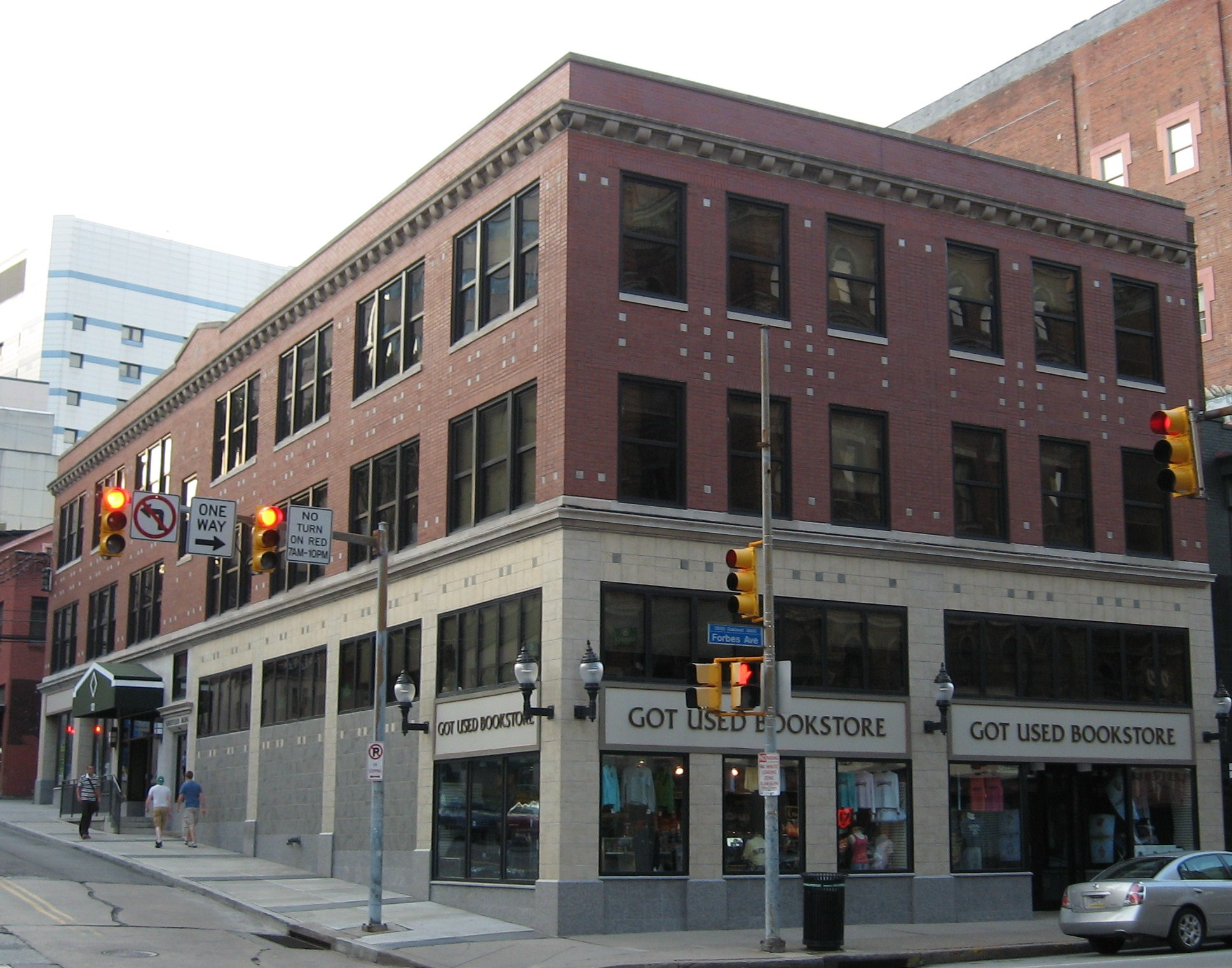
Loeffler Building of the University of Pittsburgh, at the corner of Forbes and Meyran Avenues.

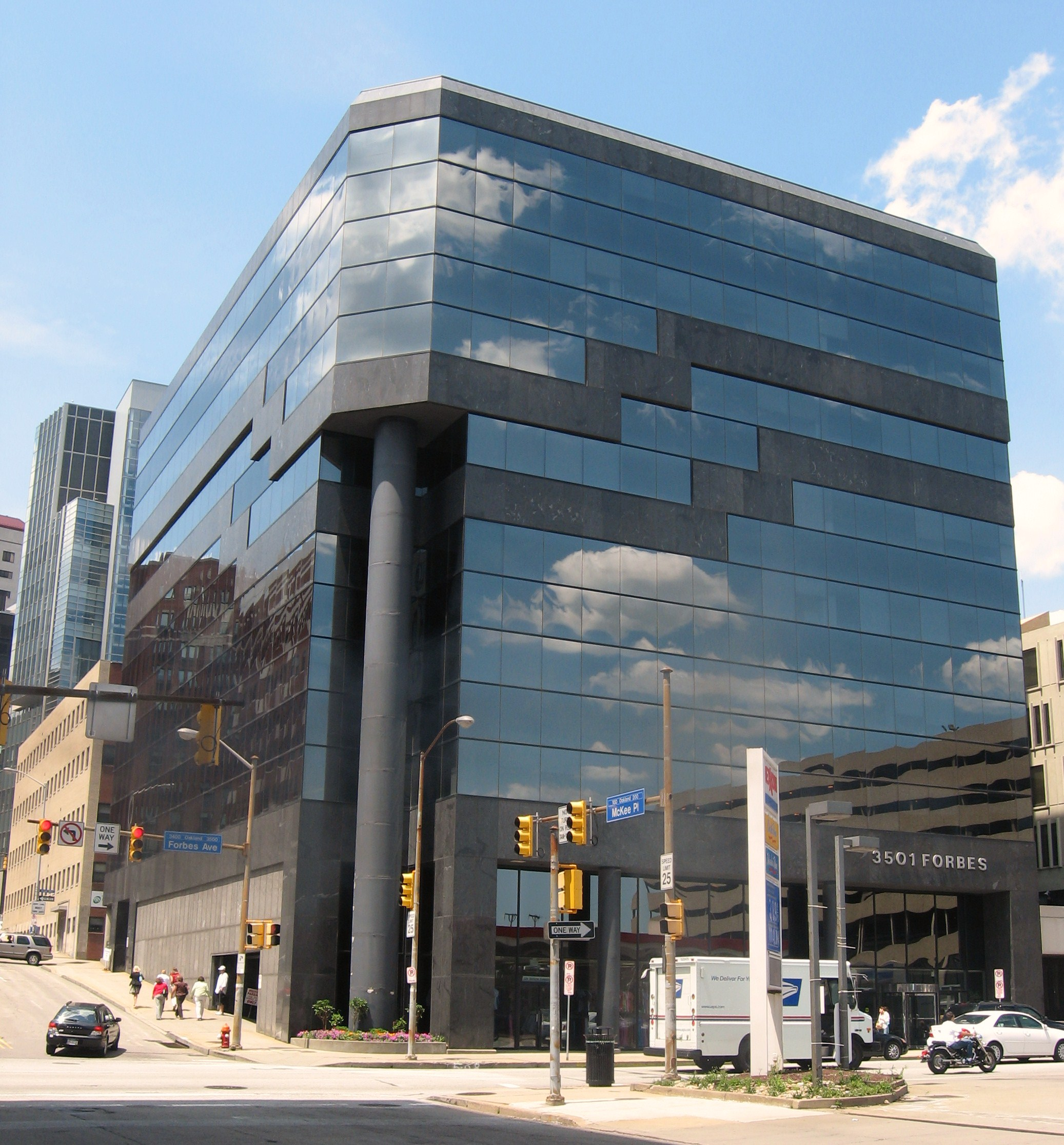
The Oxford Building of the University of Pittsburgh, at 3501 Forbes Avenue.

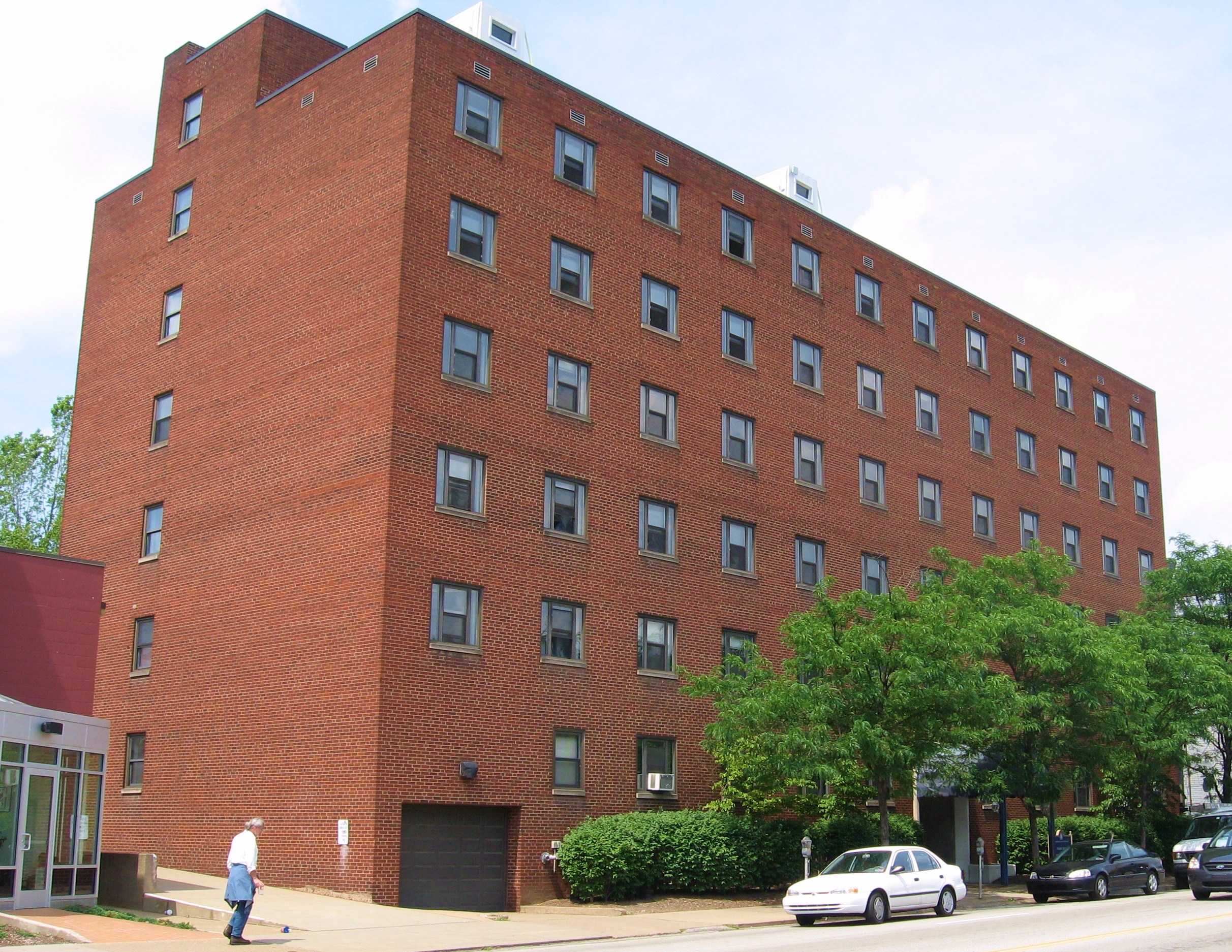
Forbes Craig Apartments of University of Pittsburgh, at the corner of Forbes Avenue and S. Craig Street.

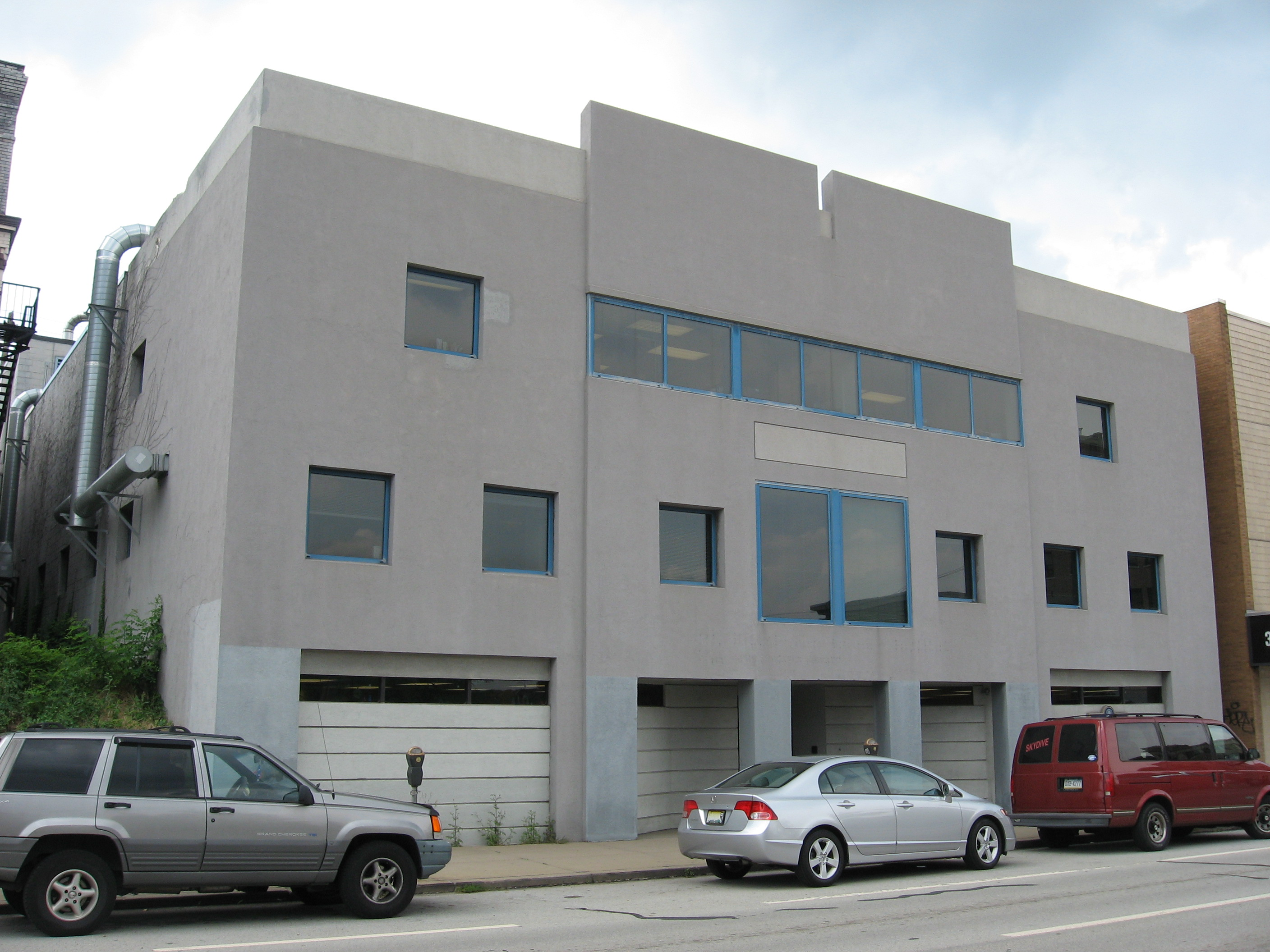
Building at 3343 Forbes Avenue, owned by the University of Pittsburgh.

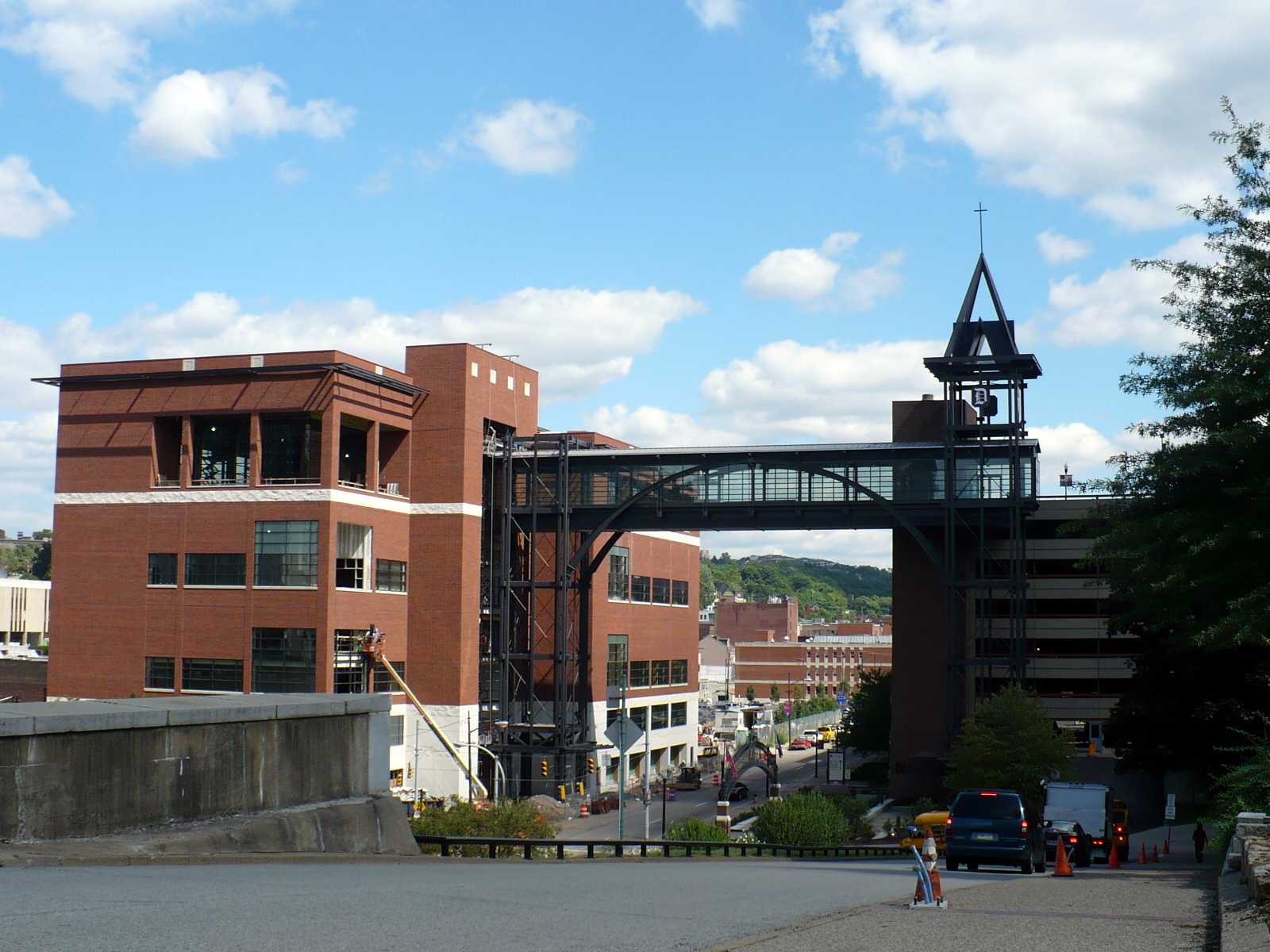
Duquesne University's Forbes construction project, including the Sklar Skywalk, which passes over Forbes Avenue.

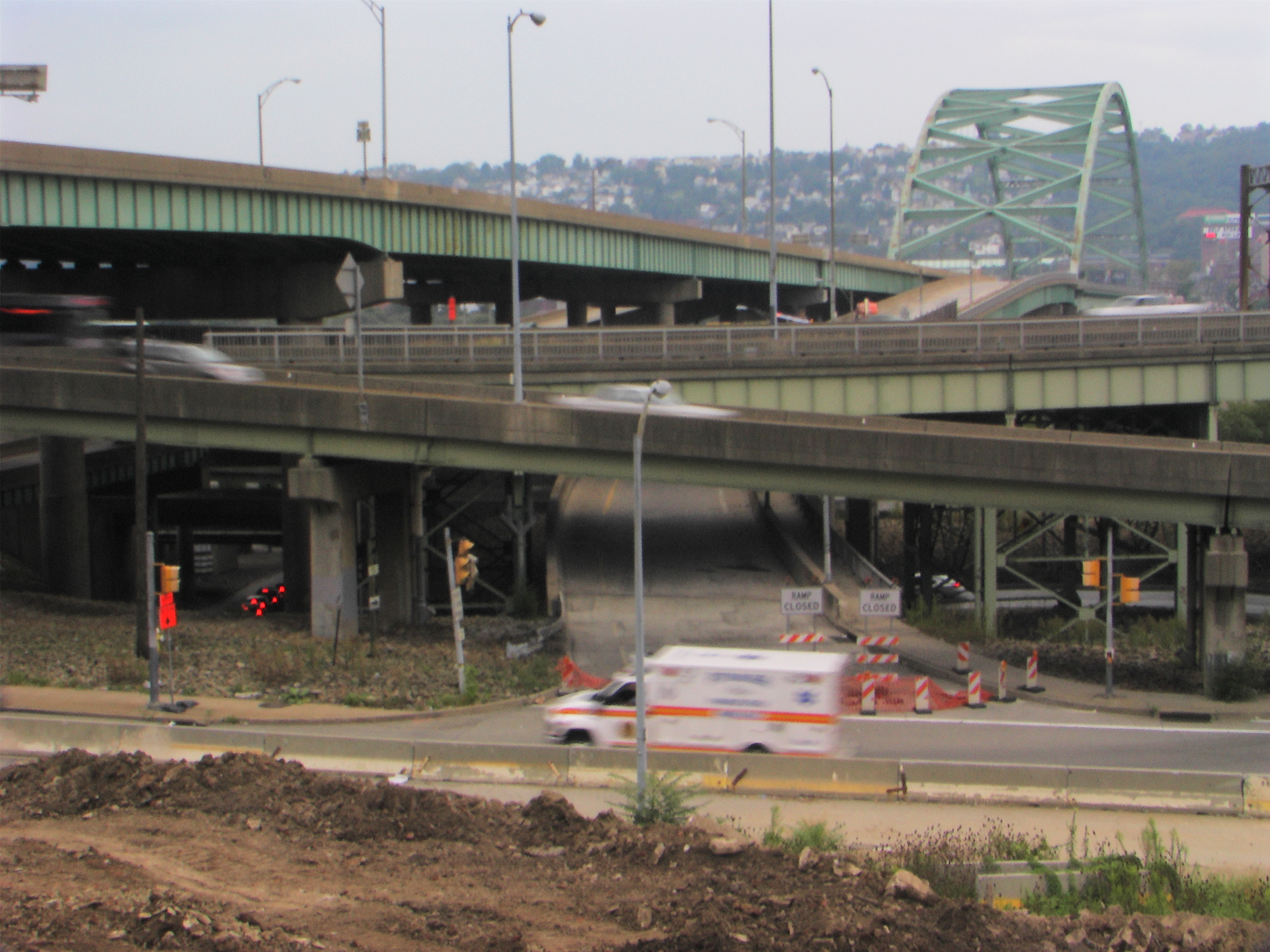
Truck on Forbes Avenue passing a ramp of the Birmingham Bridge in Bluff.

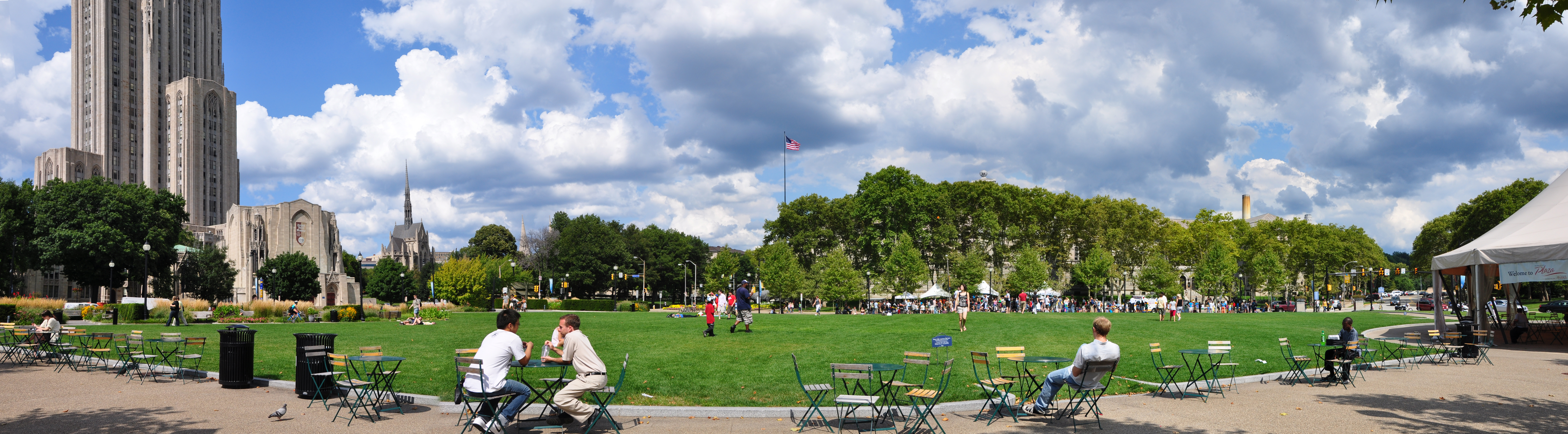
Schenley Plaza, located at Forbes Avenue and Schenley Drive.
