= Birmingham Bridge =

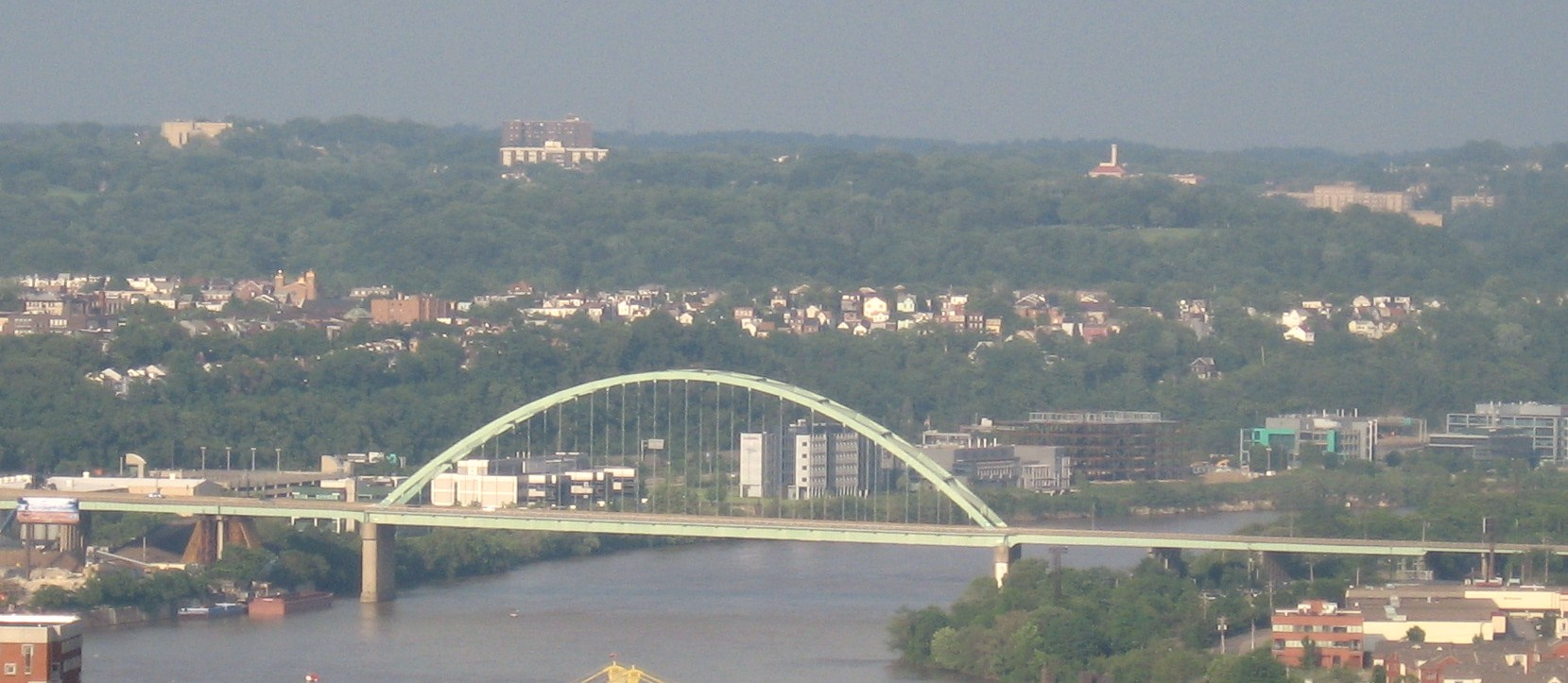
- Coordinates: 40.4334°N 79.9735°W
- Carries: 6 lanes of roadway 1 pedestrian walkway
- Crosses: Monongahela River
- Locale: Pittsburgh, Pennsylvania
- Other name: pghe587-22
- Maintained by: PennDOT
- Preceded by: Brady Street Bridge

Characteristics
- Design: Steel bowstring arch bridge
- Total length: 1,662 feet (507 m)
- Longest span: 607 feet (185 m)
- Clearance below: 64.8 feet (19.8 m)

History
- Opened: September 2, 1977
- Replaces: Brady Street Bridge

Location
- Interactive map of Birmingham Bridge

The Birmingham Bridge (known during construction as the Brady Street Bridge) is a bowstring arch bridge that is located in Pittsburgh, Pennsylvania and spans the Monongahela River.

It connects East Carson Street on the South Side with Fifth and Forbes Avenues going to Uptown, Oakland, and the Hill District, and was named in honor of the English city of Birmingham and also for the neighborhood it connects to, which was once called Birmingham and is now a part of the South Side.

Many locals also may refer to it by its unofficial name, the 22nd Street Bridge.

== History ==
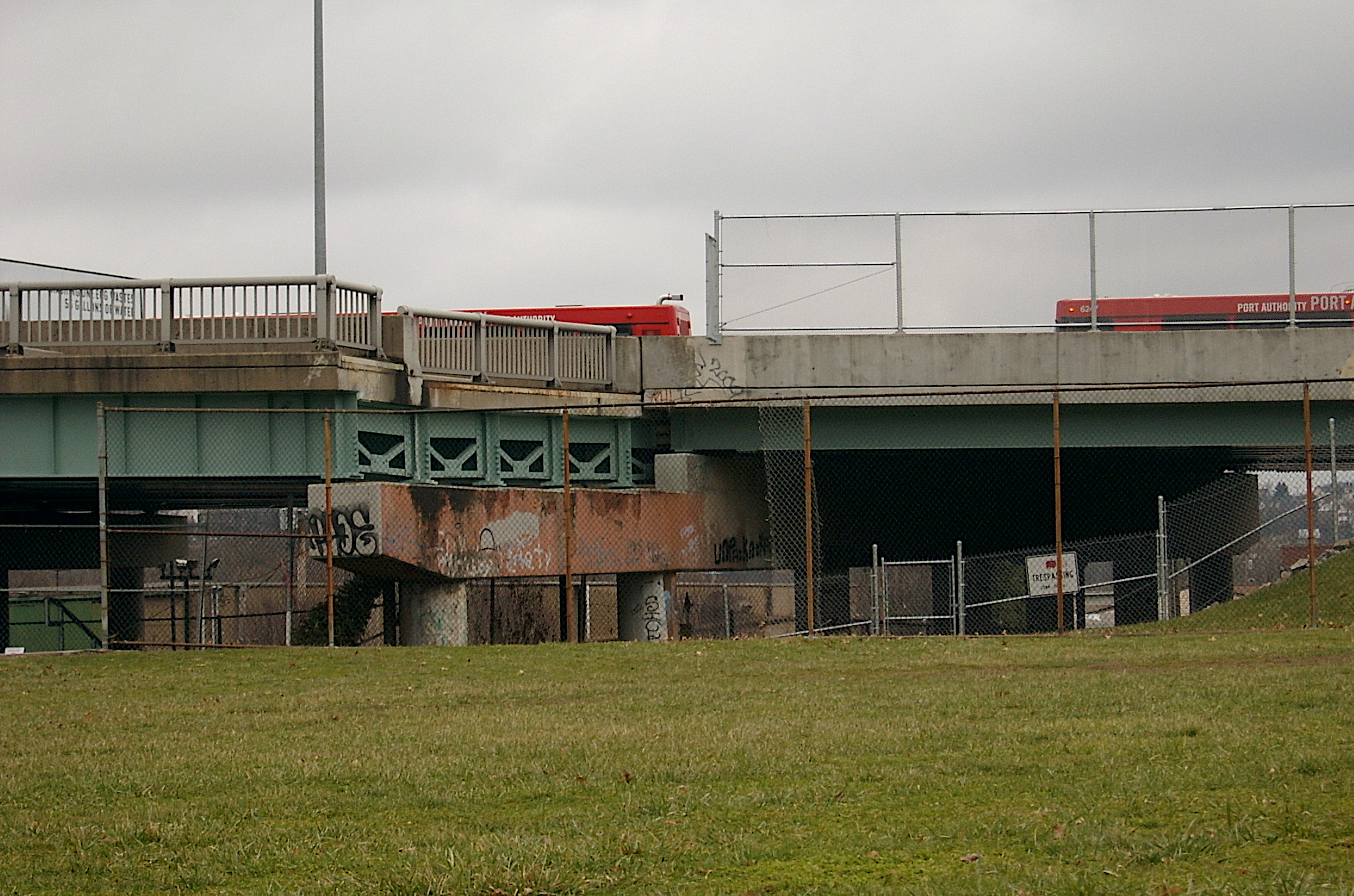
Stub of a never-built exit ramp

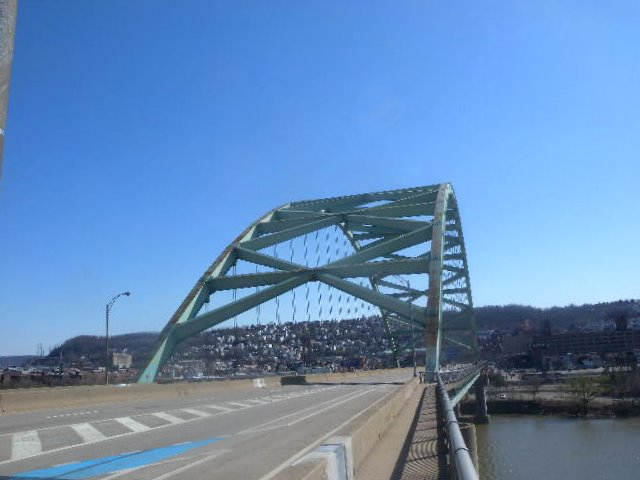
North side

The Birmingham Bridge was built in 1976. It replaced the South 22nd Street Bridge (aka Brady Street Bridge), which was demolished on May 29, 1978. Six days before the demolition, the Pittsburgh Police, Fire, and EMS responded to a construction worker who had pinned his leg near the top of the span. After attempting unsuccessful rescues, they finally hoisted a surgeon to the site and were forced to amputate on-site to save the worker's life.

After the Brady Street Bridge came down, railings from its remains were rescued by the Pittsburgh History and Landmarks Foundation and utilized in the construction of the Station Square station.

The Birmingham Bridge is notable for the dead-end lanes that were originally to be part of a city belt system. The project was canceled, and the bridge was rerouted. A pedestrian walkway runs along the downstream side of the bridge, ending at steps at the south abutment of the bridge.

On April 2, 2007, large sections of the bridge were shut down for repair. The repair project was expected to finish on November 1, 2007. While the project did not complete on time, by late November, all barricades had been removed, and all lanes were again open. During the bridge rehabilitation, bike lanes were added along the outer sides of both the northbound and southbound traffic lanes.

On February 8, 2008, the bridge was closed for inspection after a motorist called 911 when the deck dropped several inches. PennDOT indicated that one of the rockers that support bridge beams slipped and "feels it is in the best interest of the traveling public to close the outbound lanes at this time and conduct a thorough inspection to ensure the integrity of the structure. In the early morning hours of Monday, March 3, 2008, the southbound deck reopened to serve traffic in both directions, cars, and buses only. On September 8, 2008, the northbound deck was fully reopened, and northbound traffic was relocated. The inner lane of the southbound deck remained closed, and southbound trucks were still barred from the span.

It was initially called the Brady Street Bridge during construction, but in March 1977 the Pennsylvania General Assembly renamed it the Birmingham Bridge at the behest of State Senator James A. Romanelli.

== In the media ==
In the TV show Fringe, the Birmingham Bridge collapsed in September 2007 from an unknown cause.

== See also ==
- Brady Street Bridge, the previous bridge at the same location
- List of bridges documented by the Historic American Engineering Record in Pennsylvania
- List of crossings of the Monongahela River
- Birmingham, Allegheny County, Pennsylvania, the former borough it served and bearing its namesake.
