= Lichtveld =

Lichtveld is a surname of Dutch origin. Notable people with the surname include:

- Lou Lichtveld (1903–1996), Surinamese politician, playwright and poet
- Maureen Lichtveld, American epidemiologist
- Noni Lichtveld (1929–2017), Dutch-Surinamese author, illustrator and scenic designer

== See also ==
- Lichtenfeld, surname
