= Crabtree Hall =

Crabtree Hall may refer to:

- Crabtree Hall (University of Massachusetts Amherst)
- Crabtree Hall (University of Pittsburgh)
- Crabtree Hall (University of Wisconsin–River Falls)
- Crabtree Hall, a business centre in Northallerton, UK
