= Crawford Hall =

Crawford Hall may refer to:

- Crawford Hall (Irvine), an athletics building at the University of California, Irvine
- Crawford Hall, a building at the University of Pittsburgh
- Crawford Hall, a residence dormitory in Ohio State University housing
- Crawford Hall, University of Mysore vice chancellor’s office
