= Litchfield Towers =

Complex of residence halls at the University of Pittsburgh's main campus

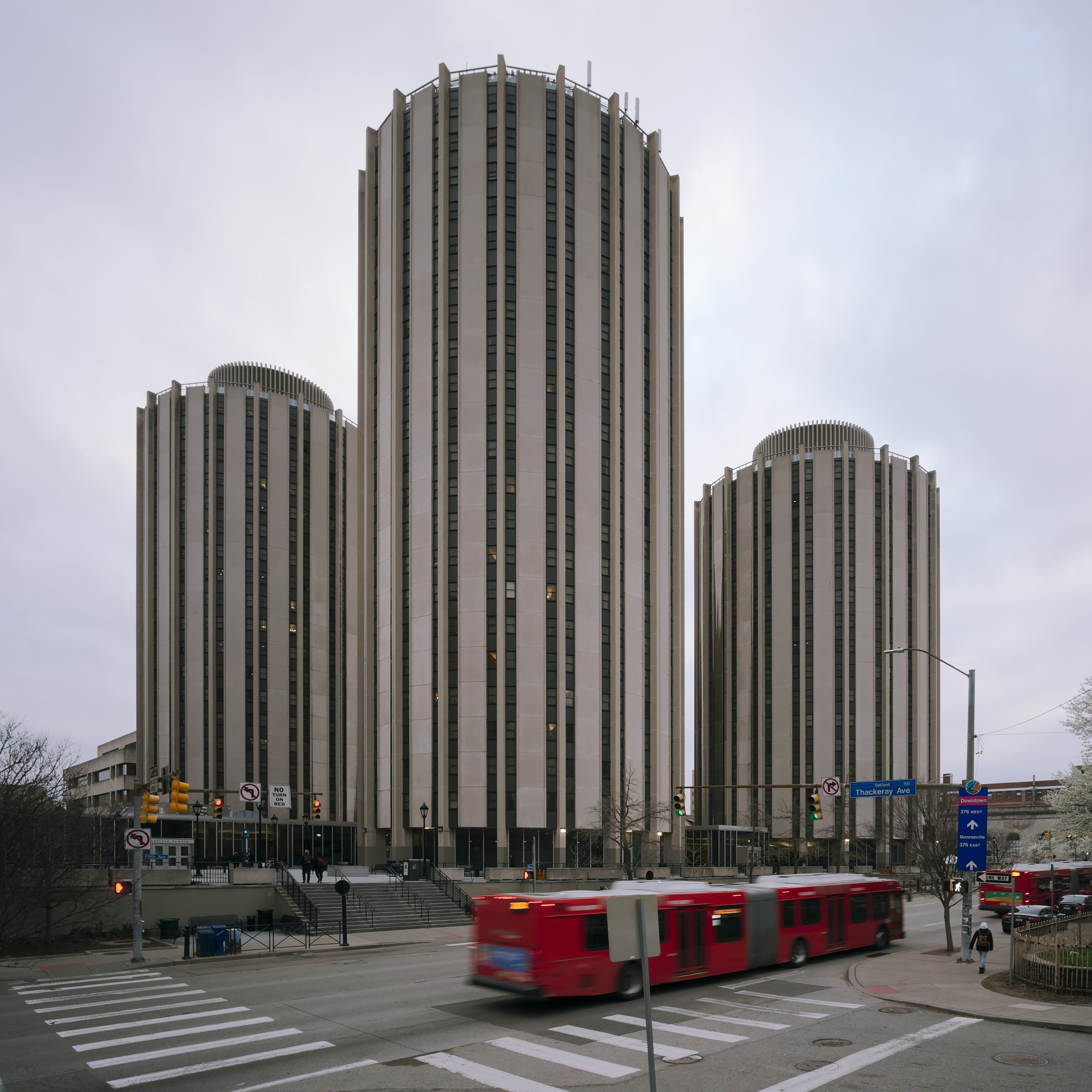
- From left to right, Towers A, B, and C
- Interactive map of the Litchfield Towers area
- Former names: Tower Residence Halls
- Alternative names: the Towers

General information
- Architectural style: International Style
- Location: Oakland neighborhood, Pittsburgh, United States
- Coordinates: 40°26′33″N 79°57′25″W
- Current tenants: ~1,850 students
- Cost: $14 million
- Owner: University of Pittsburgh

Height
- Height: From lobby to roof: Tower A 198.3 feet (60.4 m); Tower B 224.4 feet (68.4 m); Tower C 171 feet (52 m)

Design and construction
- Architect: Dahlen Klahre Ritchey
- Architecture firm: Deeter & Ritchey

Litchfield Towers, commonly referred to on campus as "Towers", is a complex of residence halls at the University of Pittsburgh's main campus in the Oakland neighborhood of Pittsburgh, Pennsylvania, United States. Litchfield Towers is both the largest and tallest residence hall at the University of Pittsburgh, housing approximately 1,850 students.

Designed by the architectural firm of Deeter & Ritchey, the complex was completed in 1963 and was named for former chancellor Edward Litchfield following his death in an airplane crash in 1968. The complex consists of three towers, which during construction were designated A, B, and C in the architectural plans. The names stuck after the towers were completed, and the towers are still so named today.

Towers A, B, and C house mostly first-year freshmen. The towers are all of different heights, and differ slightly in their living accommodations. Tower B is the tallest of the three, at 22 stories. Tower A is 19 stories tall, and Tower C is 16 stories in height. Rooms in Towers A and B are the same size, roughly 17 ft (5.2 m) by 11 ft (3.4 m). These measurements are not exact, however, because the three towers are cylindrical in shape (although actually twenty-sided) and the rooms themselves are therefore somewhat trapezoidal.

== History ==
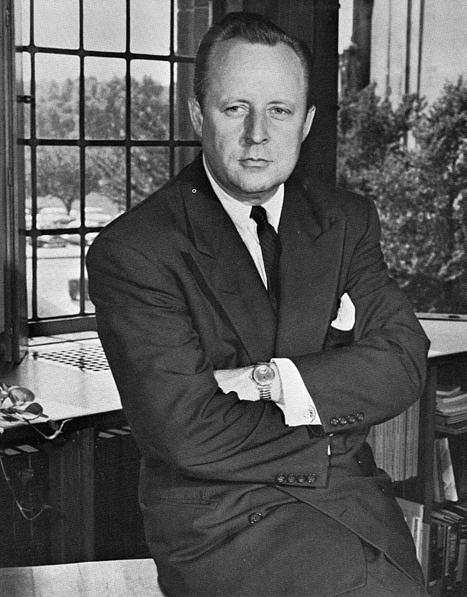
Edward Litchfield

The original proposal for the "unusual skyscraper dormitory" complex, designed by Dahlen Ritchey of the architectural firm of Deeter & Ritchey, was unveiled in June, 1960 and called for three towers to contain living quarters with unobstructed views for 1,868 male students. The towers were preliminarily designated as A, B, and C, with undergraduates to occupy tower A and B and graduate students tower C. The towers would rise from a three-story base that included a dining room accommodating 14,000 students, serving men from the towers and women from the nearby Schenley Quadrangle residences, as well a parking garage in its bottom level. Construction was initially delayed a year due to perceived high expense, but the dormitories opened in September, 1963 at a cost of $14 million with initially 1,150 residents filling approximately two-thirds of the spaces.

The reference to the three towers as A, B, and C, which originated in their designs, remains to this day, although from their inception, the towers have been designated with unofficial nicknames reflecting the similarity of their shape to the canister packaging of the commercial cleansing products Ajax, Bab-O, and Comet. Due to the obscurity of Bab-O cleanser in more recent years, Tower B has often been referred to by the nicknames Bon Ami, Borax, and Bounty.

Collectively, the dorms were at first simply referred to by the university as the Tower Residence Halls. In 1971, the university formally named the complex Litchfield Towers in honor of Edward Litchfield who had served as Pitt's chancellor during their construction and subsequently died in a tragic 1968 airplane crash.

== Towers A and B ==
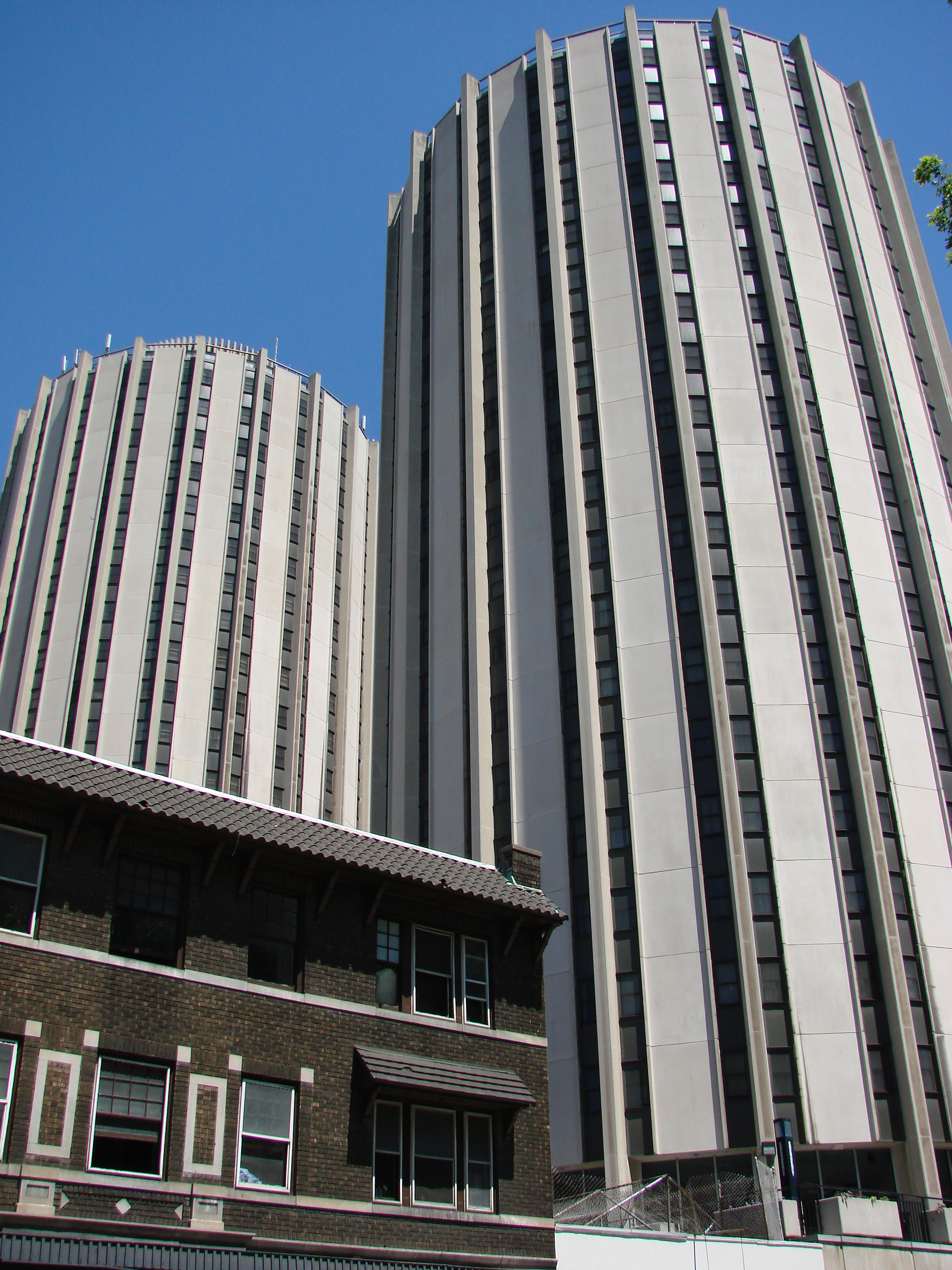
Tower A (right) and Tower B (left)

Towers A and B are very similar to each other. All rooms in both towers are doubles, meaning that two people share each room. There is a lounge the size of three dorm rooms every third floor, containing a large television and several couches and tables for studying. Communal and university-sponsored events frequently take place in the various lounges throughout the towers. Every floor shares a communal bathroom, with several shower and restroom stalls. Each floor has twenty rooms, except for the lounge floors, which only have seventeen. Each floor's resident assistant lives alone in their respective room, meaning each floor houses 39 people. On the ground floor of Tower A there is a small fitness center containing treadmills, ellipticals, bikes, and weight equipment. A fully functioning post office and all student mailboxes are located on the ground floor of Tower B. Due to the fact that both Towers A and B are exclusively residences for first year students, they are both designated as alcohol-free. Its distribution, sale, and consumption, is punished if discovered.

Previously, there had been several specialized student communities in Litchfield Towers which are set aside by the university, although they have since moved to other on-campus housing spaces. Students Pursuing Academics and Careers in Engineering, commonly referred to as the "SPACE" floors, was located on floors 8 through 11 of Tower A until it was moved to Forbes Hall in 2011. The University Honors College first-year Living Learning Community was housed on floors 11 and 12 of Tower B prior to 2005, and then on floors 11 through 14 after 2005, and the University of Pittsburgh College of Business Administration Living Learning Community is located on floors 9 and 10 of Tower B. After the 2006–2007 school year, The University Honors College First-Year Honors Community was moved to Forbes Hall until 2011 when it moved to Sutherland Hall, while the College of Business Administration Living Learning Community was moved directly to Sutherland Hall in 2007.

== Tower C ==
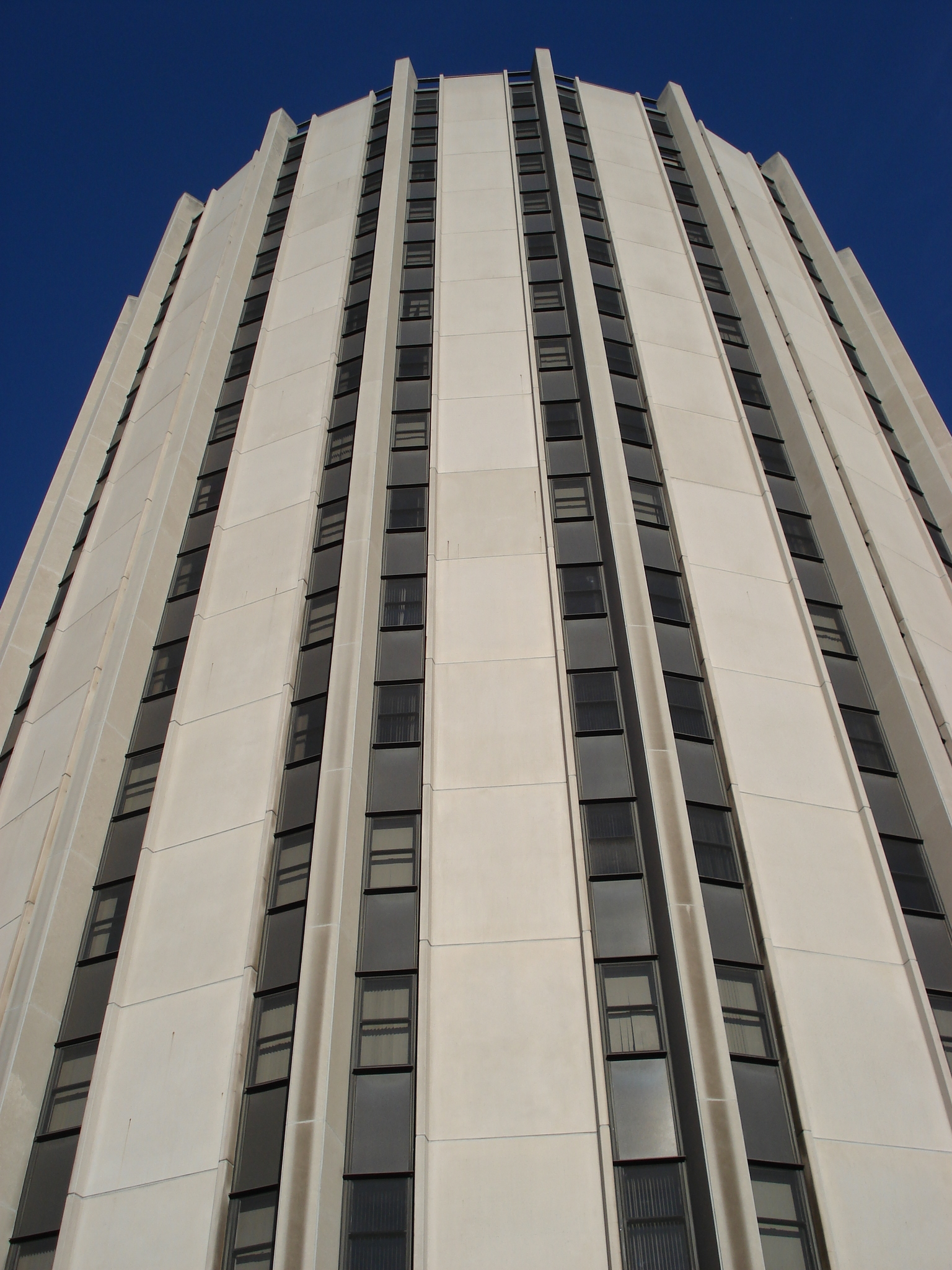
Tower C, Floors 3–16

Tower C is different from Towers A and B in several ways, but primarily in the fact that its rooms are single occupancy. The rooms are 2/3 the size of rooms in Towers A and B, and like Tower A and Tower B, every third floor has a lounge containing a television, couches, and tables for extra study. In addition, each floor has 30 rooms, except floors containing a lounge, which have 27. The ROTC Living Learning Community is located in Tower C. Up until 2010–11, Tower C was open to students of any year, however it now houses primarily first-year students.

== Student services ==
As the largest dormitory on the University of Pittsburgh's campus, Litchfield Towers is home to several student services in order to accommodate its large population.

=== Panther Central ===
Panther Central is the center for most basic student services. Some of these services include issuing of student ID cards, replacement of lost ID cards, verifying residential status for students with forgotten ID cards, dispensing of general information, placing maintenance requests for rooms, and other such services.

=== Dining services ===
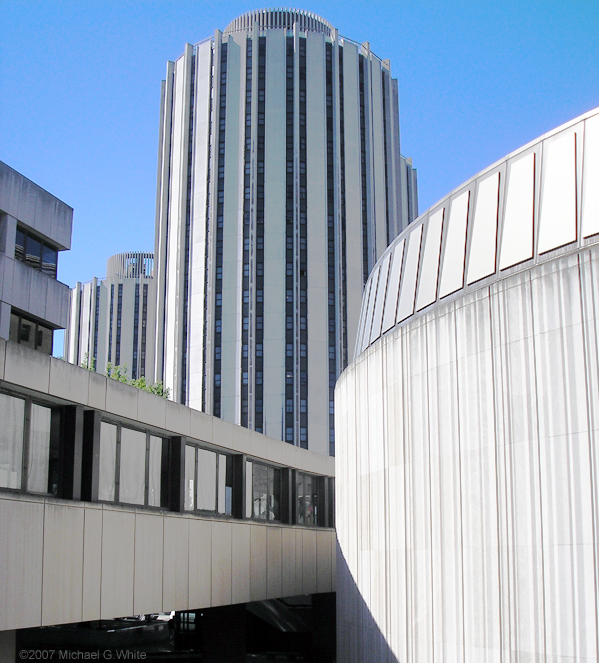
Pedestrian bridge connecting to the Towers' lobby from the Barco Law Building (left), David Lawrence Hall (right) and Posvar Hall. Tower A is seen center.

Until the 2007 academic year, the ground floor of the Litchfield towers complex housed two University dining facilities, both run by the French food service conglomerate Sodexo. "The Marketplace" (formerly known as C-Side) was an all-you-can-eat buffet serving traditional foods such as pastas and salad. The menu changed throughout the day, starting with breakfast foods such as waffles and cereal and ending with dinner dishes such as lasagna. The other, "Eddie's", was structured more like a food court, with several stand-alone food shops serving such foods as sandwiches, chicken, and hamburgers. Eddie's also contained a small grocery store mainly selling snack foods and pre-packaged dinners. The grocery store offered a small selection of kosher foods. The small shop in the lobby of Towers, "Common Grounds", which sells coffee, juice, bagels, and various other baked goods still remains.

For the fall of 2007, the Litchfield Tower dining facilities were completely remodeled. The newly renovated dining hall has been named "Market Central", and contains six new all-you-can-eat venues and two takeout areas ("Market-To-Go" and "Quick Zone"). Often referred to as just "Market" by campus residents, Market Central's venues offer a great deal of variety. The Flying S-T-A-R Diner, for example, offers around-the-clock breakfast while Magellan's serves up food from around the world such as eggrolls and other ethnic specialties. Upon entering, students present their campus IDs to gain access to all six venues for their entire duration in the facility. Meal passes or dining dollars can be used for admittance. In 2013, renovations to Market Central included doubling the size of the Quick Zone and the addition of "Towers Treats" ice cream and dessert booth. Another renovation on the eatery began in 2023 and was completed in 2025, which added colorful decor, an app-controlled jukebox, and greenery. The work also included 11 new cuisine concepts. An artificial intelligence technology developed by Amazon called Just Walk Out was also introduced. It allowed students to buy their items and leave The Market without having to check out.

=== Security ===
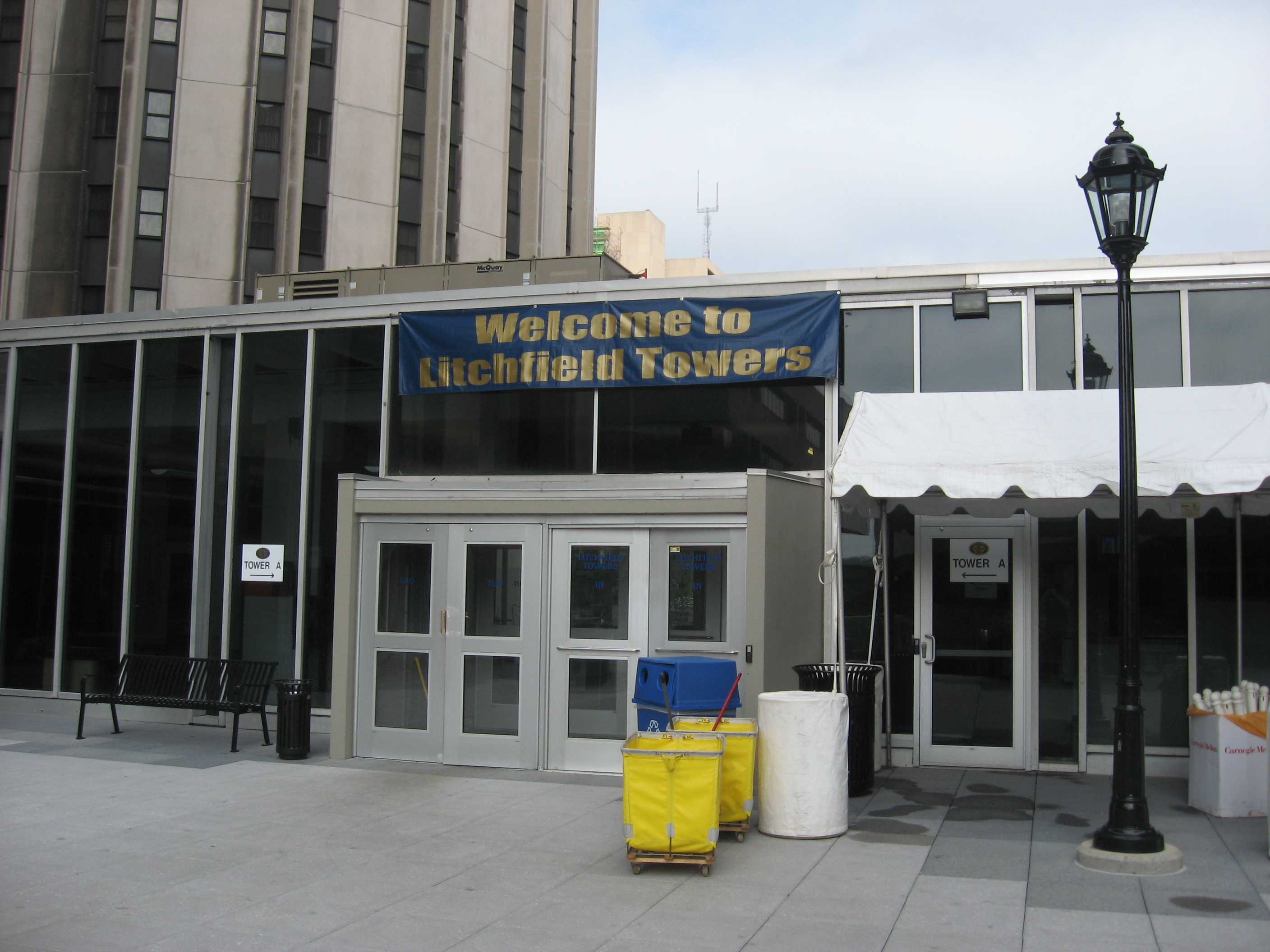
Forbes Avenue entrance to the Litchfield Towers lobby during the 2009 orientation week.

Although Panther Central, the Towers Lobby which connects all three towers, and the dining services located on the ground floor are accessible to everyone, only residents are allowed in the individual towers and must present their student ID card to a 24-hour security guard to gain entrance. Visitors to any of the Towers must be signed in by a resident of the Tower, and must present either their student ID card if they are a student or a valid form of photographic identification if they are not. Guests signed in by residents must be signed out and leave the Tower by 2:00 AM. If not, an overnight stay request must be completed, of which a student can only file a certain number each academic semester. No resident is permitted to sign in more than three people at one time.

During the designated moving-in/moving-out periods at the beginning and end of semesters, the elevators in all three Towers can access the basement garage, allowing students and visitors the ability to travel freely between Towers.

Preceded by Trees Hall	University of Pittsburgh buildings Litchfield Towers; Constructed: 1963	Succeeded by Forbes Hall
