= University of Pittsburgh School of Public Health =

School of the University of Pittsburgh

Coordinates: 40°26′34″N 79°57′30″W

- Type: Public
- Established: 1948
- Dean: Maureen Lichtveld
- Academic staff: 160 primary, 400 total
- Administrative staff: 520
- Postgraduates: 484
- Location: Pittsburgh, Pennsylvania, US
- Campus: Oakland (Pittsburgh)
- Website: www.publichealth.pitt.edu

The School of Public Health (sometimes shortened to Pitt Public Health) is one of 17 schools at the University of Pittsburgh. The school, founded in 1948, was first led by Thomas Parran, surgeon general of the U.S. Public Health Service. It was the first of only two fully accredited schools of public health in Pennsylvania (the other being Drexel University's School of Public Health in Philadelphia). The school offers a Bachelor's of Science in Public Health (BSPH), Masters of Public Health (MPH), Master of Science (MS), Master of Health Administration, and doctoral degrees (PhD, DrPH) in areas such as behavioral and community health sciences, biostatistics, environmental and occupational health, epidemiology, health policy and management, human genetics, and infectious disease and microbiology.

== History ==
A desire by Pittsburgh residents to better understand the health risks from pollution released from the city's many steel mills in the early 20th century led to the creation of Pitt's School of Public Health in 1948 with a $13.6 million grant from the A. W. Mellon Educational and Charitable Trust. Originating in the renovated former Municipal Hospital, now Salk Hall, the school was accredited on April 6, 1950, and admitted its first class of 29 full-time and 5 part-time students in September 1950. The school moved into a new facility, now named Parran Hall, completed for it in 1957. The school's first dean, Thomas Parran, had previously founded the World Health Organization and served for twelve years as Surgeon General of the United States. Parran guided the early development of the school and recruited many of its prominent early faculty. An early focus of the school was occupational and industrial health and hygiene in the steel mills of Pittsburgh. These studies, and Pitt Public Health investigations of black lung among coal miners, strongly influenced the Occupational Safety and Health Act of 1970 which, based mostly on school generated data, created the first national standards for on-the-job worker safety and health. Although the scope of the school has greatly broadened, this theme of research has continued throughout the years with significant implications including, among other things, information on the hazards of asbestos. Pitt Public Health has become one of the top schools for sponsored research funding. It has also pioneered research directions: it the first school of public health to have a department of human genetics; it had the first and only public health school chair in minority health; and played a critical role in understanding diseases such as AIDS for which it initiated the longest-running national study of the natural history of the disease. It continues to maintain strong relationships with regional and national government agencies such as the Allegheny County Health Department and the Centers for Disease Control and Prevention, and has produced over 5,000 alumni in its 60 years of history.

On July 1, 2019, the school's longest-serving dean, Donald S. Burke, MD, stepped down and A. Everette James became interim dean. In January 2021, Maureen Lichtveld, MPH, MD, became the school's dean.

== Interdisciplinary themes ==
The Pitt Public Health ranks among the top five public health schools in the United States, measured by National Institutes of Health (NIH) funding. Since 2000, it has won more than $1 billion in NIH funding for research and service in the following areas:

- Designing, conducting, and analyzing clinical trials of new health interventions
- Using computational models to prepare national responses to outbreaks of infectious diseases
- Monitoring the quality of air and drinking water
- Advancing policies to improve industrial hygiene and work safety
- Evaluating new vaccine technologies for global diseases
- Providing expert testimony to policy makers with respect to public health issues
- Developing state-level systems models of legal, economic, and operational preparedness for emergency response planning
- Addressing health disparities among under-represented populations
- Providing policy makers with credible scientific information related to potential health impacts of shale gas extraction
- Lowering the incidence of illness in schools
- Improving the ability of seniors to live longer and more safely in their own homes
- Limiting and reducing the spread of HIV/AIDS
- Improving standards of care in nursing homes
- Educating trustees of area health care providers on governance best practices
- Providing practical and effective guidance to families and schools to combat childhood and adult obesity

== Departments ==
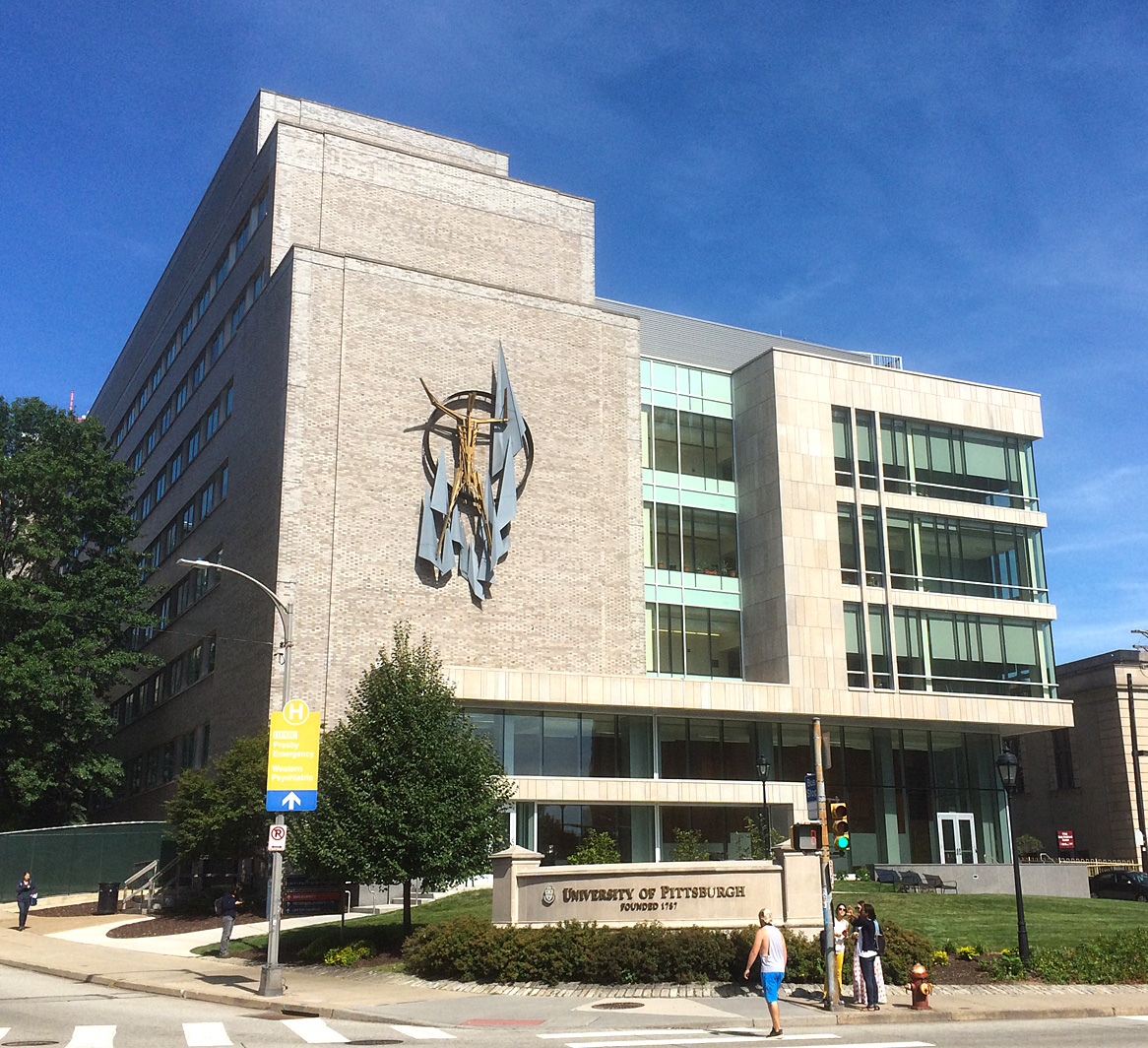
The home of the University of Pittsburgh Graduate School of Public Health (Pitt Public Health).

- Behavioral and Community Health Sciences
- Biostatistics and Health Data Science
- Environmental and Occupational Health
- Epidemiology
- Health Policy and Management
- Human Genetics
- Infectious Diseases and Microbiology

== Centers and institutes ==
Pitt Public Health is responsible for or participates in the operation a variety of different public health centers and institutes including:

- Center for Global Health
- Center for Health Equity
- Center for Public Health Practice
- Center for Public Health Preparedness
- Pennsylvania & Ohio Public Health Training Center
- University of Pittsburgh Epidemiology Data Center
- Center for Healthy Environments & Communities
- Public Health Dynamics Laboratory
- Center for LGBT Health Research
- Health Policy Institute
- Epidemiology Data Center
- Diabetes Prevention Support Center
- Center for Aging and Population Health

== Sources ==
- Alberts, Robert C. (1987). Pitt: The Story of the University of Pittsburgh 1787–1987. University of Pittsburgh Press. ISBN 0-8229-1150-7.
