= Edward H. Litchfield =

American academic administrator

Edward Litchfield
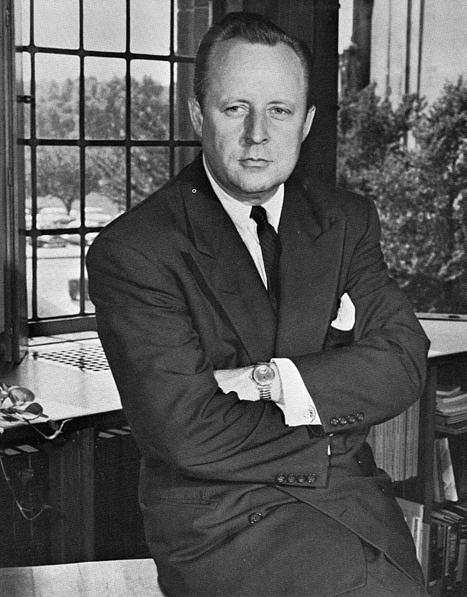

12th Chancellor of the University of Pittsburgh
- In office 1956 – July 1965
- Preceded by: Rufus Fitzgerald
- Succeeded by: Stanton Crawford

Personal details
- Born: April 14, 1914; Detroit, Michigan, U.S.
- Died: March 8, 1968 (aged 53); Lake Michigan
- Cause of death: Plane crash
- Education: University of Michigan (BA, MA, PhD)

Edward Harold Litchfield (April 14, 1914 – March 8, 1968) was an American educator and the twelfth Chancellor (1956–1965) of the University of Pittsburgh. He is best known for a major expansion of the university, but also a failure to raise sufficient capital to fund such growth, eventually leading to his resignation in July 1965.

He earned the B.A., M.A., and Ph.D. at the University of Michigan. He taught political science at Brown University for a year, then from 1942 to 1945 taught public administration at the University of Michigan and also was Deputy Director of the Michigan State Civil Service Commission. In 1945 he served as director, civilian affairs in the U.S. Military Government in Germany, where he participated in the reconstruction of the occupied country. In 1953 he was appointed second dean of Cornell University's School of Business and Public Administration. His selection as Dean of the Johnson School coincided with a change in school curriculum, designed to bring the program into closer ties with the business community.

Litchfield was born in Detroit, Michigan. He died in a plane crash over Lake Michigan along with his wife, mother, two sons, and the pilot. He was a member of the Executive Board of the International Political Science Association.

Litchfield Towers, a set of three high-rise student residence halls on the University of Pittsburgh campus, are named in his honor. Virgil Cantini's 1966 steel with bronze and glass sculpture Ode to Space was commissioned as a tribute to Litchfield after his death. It sits outside the entrance to David Lawrence Hall and contains the inscription, labore ad astra or "to work toward the stars."

Preceded by Rufus Fitzgerald	University of Pittsburgh Chancellor; 1956–1965	Succeeded by Stanton Crawford
