= George Hubbard Clapp =

American businessman (1858–1949)

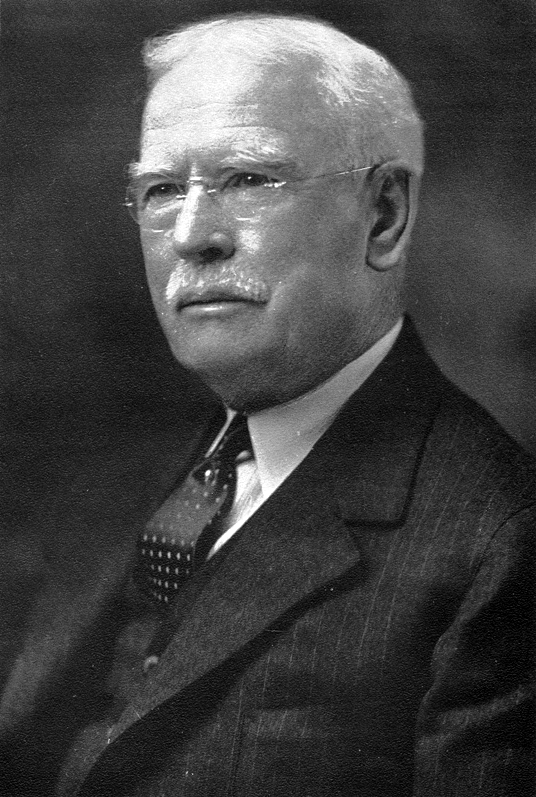
- George Hubbard Clapp
- Born: December 14, 1858; Allegheny, Pennsylvania
- Died: March 31, 1949 (aged 90); Sewickley, Pennsylvania
- Education: University of Pittsburgh
- Scientific career
- Fields: pioneer in the aluminum industry, numismatics, conchology

George Hubbard Clapp (December 14, 1858 – March 31, 1949) was an American pioneer in the aluminum industry and also a numismatist.

== Early life ==
George Hubbard Clapp was born on December 14, 1858 in Allegheny, Pennsylvania, now a part of Pittsburgh, the son of Delia Dennig Hubbard and DeWitt Clinton Clapp, an iron company executive. He graduated from the Western University of Pennsylvania, today's University of Pittsburgh, in 1877. He married Anne Love in 1882 and the couple had two children.

== Career ==
Clapp took an engineering position at Park Brothers' Black Diamond Steel Works. There, along with Captain Alfred E. Hunt, he established the Pittsburgh Testing Laboratory's chemistry department. Hunt formed a company in 1888 to exploit the Charles Martin Hall patents for making aluminum by electrolysis. Clapp was treasurer and secretary of the fledgling company. He resigned as treasurer in 1892 and was replaced by Andrew W. Mellon. The company became later known as the Aluminium Company of America. While Hall is generally credited with the invention the aluminum process, Clapp raised the initial venture capital to make the process commercially viable. The Mellon interests supplied the company's working capital.

Beginning in 1907 until his death in 1949, Clapp was president of Pitt's Board of Trustees. He was a driving force in moving the school from its North Side location to the Oakland district. He also was a trustee of the Carnegie Institute of Technology, now known as Carnegie Mellon University, and was a member of the American Chemical Society.

=== Numismatics and conchology ===
As Clapp's wealth grew, he pursued his avocational interests in conchology and numismatics. He had begun collecting coins as a boy in the 1870s by sifting through the coins of a toll bridge across the Allegheny River. He later became a founder of the Western Pennsylvania Numismatic Society. His grandfather encouraged him to start collecting shells. Over the years he assembled more than 100,000 mollusk shells, which he later donated to the Carnegie Museums of Pittsburgh. In the 1930s he donated his coin collections to both the American Numismatic Society and the Carnegie.

== Death and legacy ==
He died at age 90 on March 31, 1949, at his home in Sewickley, Pennsylvania. Clapp Hall, an academic building on the Pitt campus, is named in his honor.

== Taxa named in honor ==
- Clappia (Walker, 1909)
- Planogyra clappi (Pilsbry, 1898)
