= Forbes Hall =

Building in Pennsylvania, United States

Coordinates: 40°26′25″N 79°57′32″W

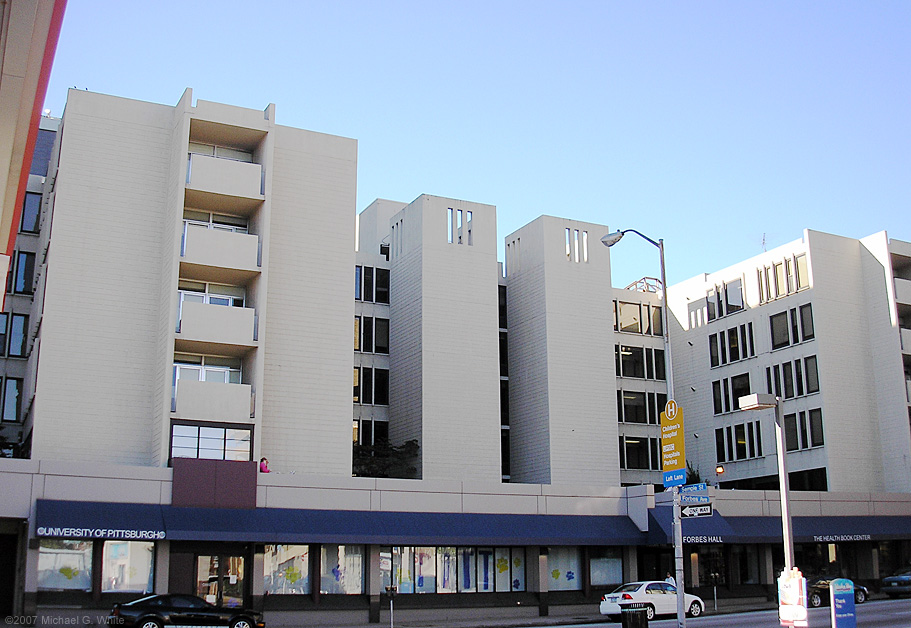
Forbes Hall at the University of Pittsburgh.

Forbes Hall is a residence hall of the University of Pittsburgh (Oakland campus) and is located in Forbes Pavilion on Forbes Avenue approximately four blocks from the Litchfield Towers complex. The name Forbes Hall, which specifically refers to the residence hall component of the building, is sometimes interchangeably used with the name Forbes Pavilion, which refers to the entire six-story structure.

== Use ==
A student mail center and printer are also available in the lobby of Forbes Hall for use by those with a Pitt user account.

A large recreation hall is on the second floor, complete with television and pool table. A second floor rooftop patio overlooks Forbes Avenue with an adjoining indoor patio room.

Occupying the remaining floors of Forbes Hall are a mix of 232 first-year men and women in double rooms that are air-conditioned. Some of the doubles have adjoining semi-private bathrooms. There are communal showers, two kitchenettes, and a laundry area on each floor. Each wing of Forbes Hall has a study room. Select rooms overlooking Forbes Avenue and Euler Way in the back of the building have small balcony areas accessible by two adjacent rooms. Each room is provided with a cable connection and Wi-Fi coverage.

Students Pursuing Academics and Careers in Engineering, commonly referred to as the "SPACE" was relocated to Forbes Hall in 2011 after previously being located in Litchfield Tower A. Prior to this, from the Fall of 2007 semester until 2011, Forbes Hall had housed the University Honors College program for first-year and upper-class men and women, which was subsequently moved to Sutherland Hall.

== History ==
Forbes Pavilion was originally built as a nursing home whose construction was completed in 1964, the nursing home closed after eight years of operations due to financial difficulty. The facility was acquired by the university and renovated to provide living quarters to students. The residence hall, consisting of three wings of four floors or residential space each, opened to students in September 1978. The University's Health Book Center, previously located for 20 years in Scaife Hall, was located on the lowest level of Forbes Pavilion from 1988 to 2011, prior to moving into the main university book store, The Book Center, on the ground level of Holland Hall.

It is alleged that Dan Marino lived in Forbes Hall during his college days.

=== G-20 incident ===
On the evening of September 24, 2009, the city of Pittsburgh was in the first official day of hosting the 2009 G-20 Pittsburgh summit. Protesters and police in riot gear, many of whom on both sides were from outside the region, clashed in and around the University of Pittsburgh campus in Oakland and along Forbes Avenue. The protesters, who had lit a garbage dumpster on fire, were pushed by the police down to the proximity of Forbes Hall where students were observing the scene from the Forbes Hall second floor patio and from their room balconies. Police then allegedly projected canisters of pepper spray onto the patio or balconies of Forbes Hall essentially gassing the students who lived in the dorms, an action that resulted in at least one student being treated at the nearby hospital, UPMC Presbyterian.

Preceded by Litchfield Towers	University of Pittsburgh buildings Forbes Hall; Constructed: 1963-1964	Succeeded by Frick Fine Arts Building
