= David Lawrence Hall =

Academic building at the University of Pittsburgh, Pennsylvania, United States

Coordinates: 40.442399°N 79.955303°W

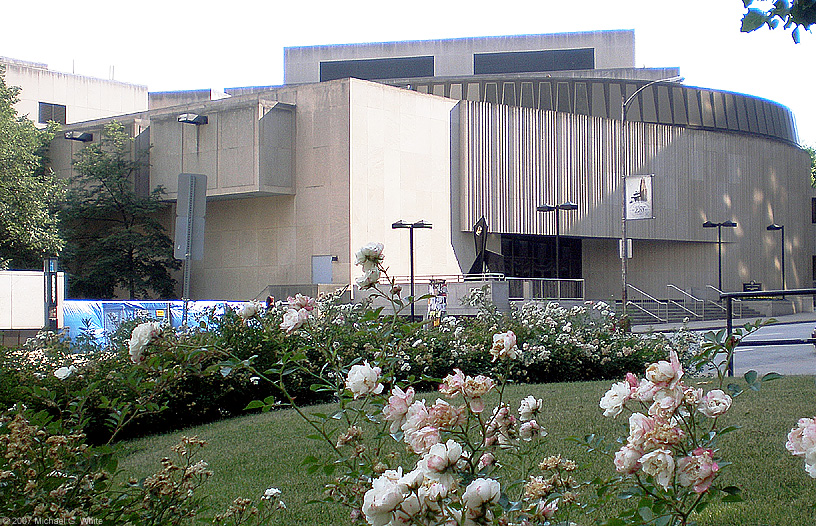
David Lawrence Hall at the University of Pittsburgh.

David Lawrence Hall is a major academic building at the University of Pittsburgh in Pittsburgh, Pennsylvania, United States, where it serves as the school's largest lecture hall and auditorium facility.

== History ==
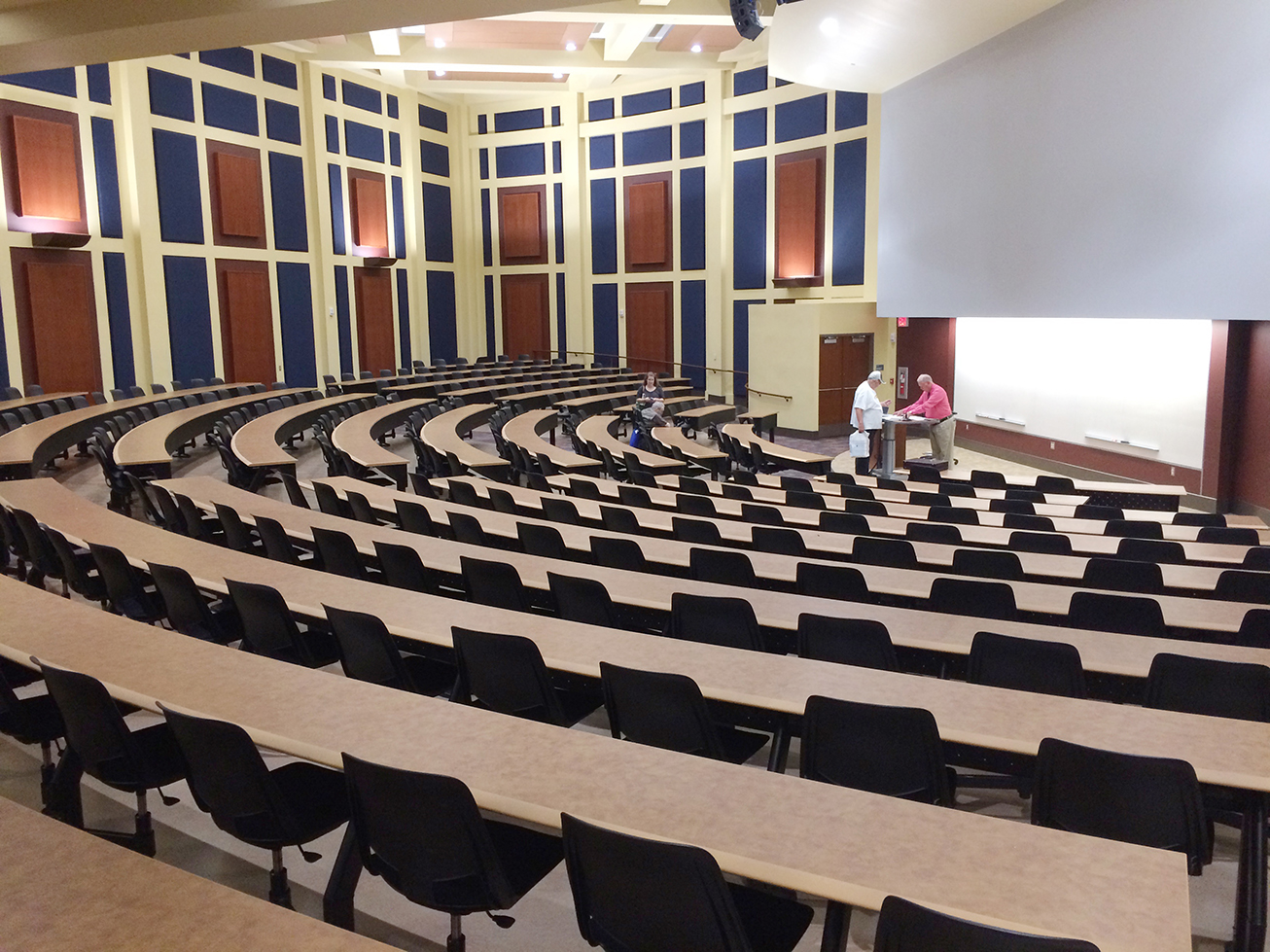
A main lecture hall in David Lawrence Hall after the 2015 renovation

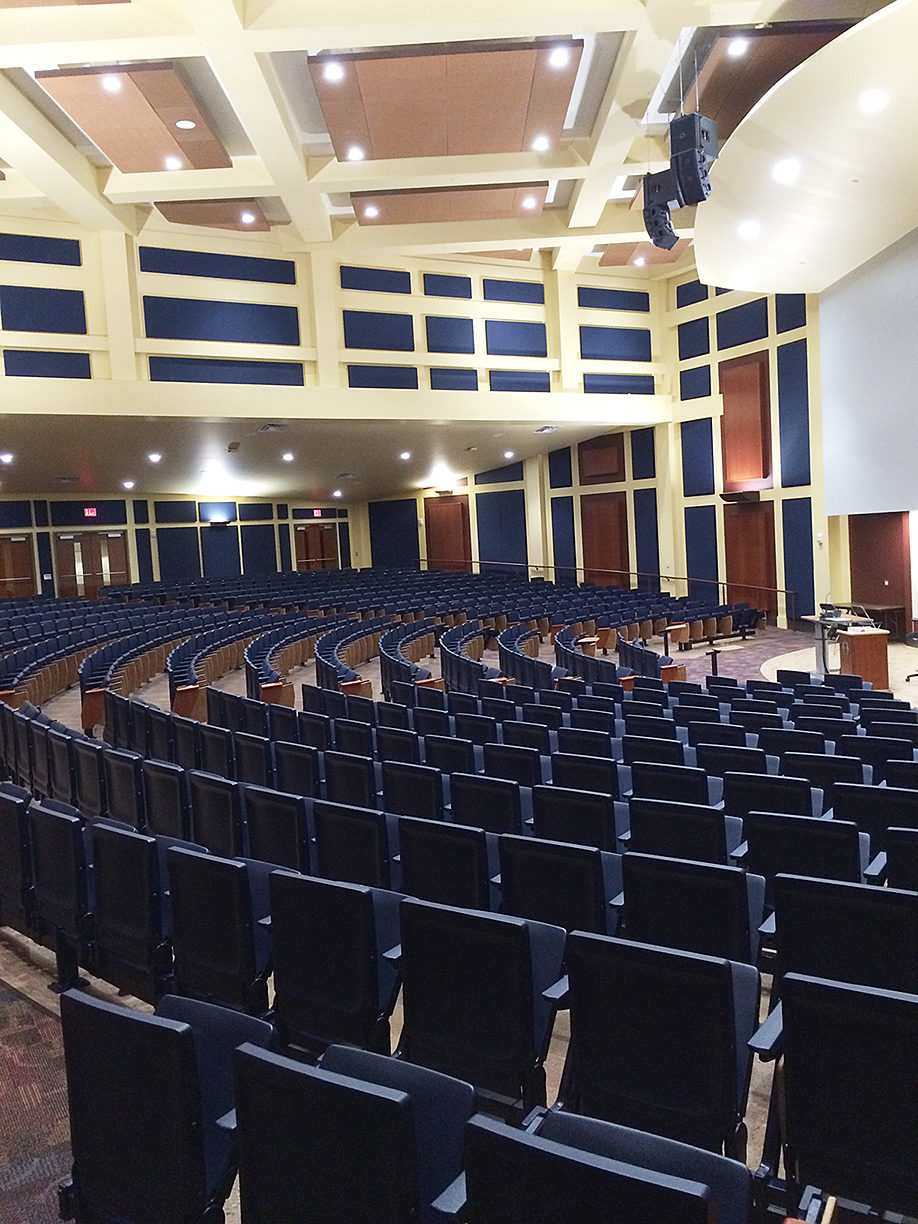
The other main lecture hall following the 2015 renovation

Lawrence Hall was constructed on the site former Pittsburgh Board of Education's central warehouse and maintenance shop which was acquired by the university for $300,000. Designed by Johnstone, McMillin & Associates, it was completed in the spring of 1968 at a cost of $2.2 million. Lawrence Hall was originally known as the Common Facilities Building, and contains a large lecture hall that is typically divided into two parts and nine classrooms on two floors. Lawrence Hall is used for social sciences classes and other disciplines across the school's curriculum.

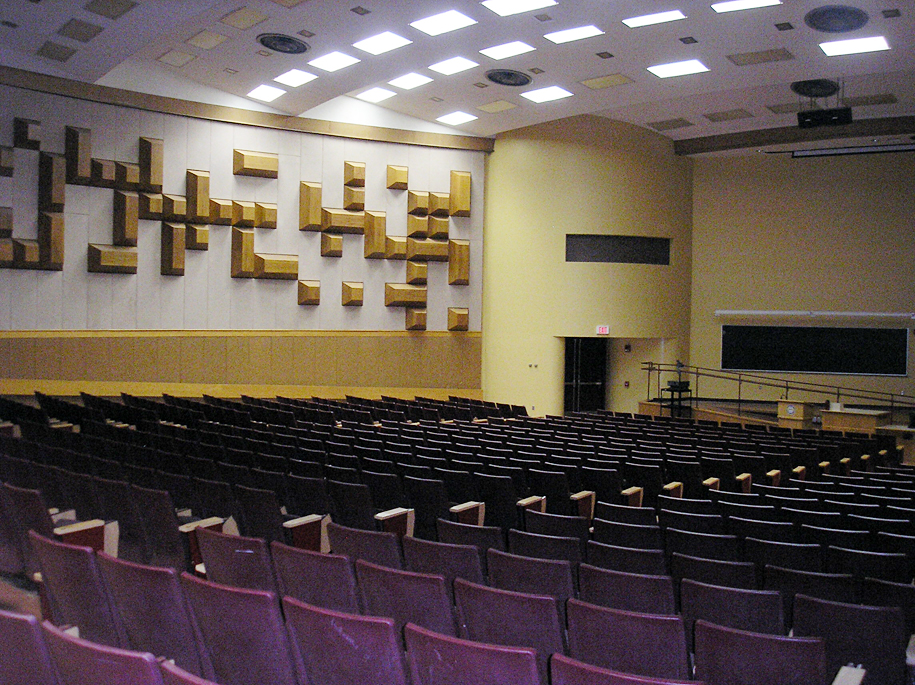
A lecture hall in prior to the 2015 renovation

In 1969, Lawrence Hall became the center of one of the largest student protests at Pitt during the late 1960s era when many student demonstrations were occurring around the world. A group calling itself the Concerned Students and Faulty attempted a three-day, round-the-clock fast in the lobby of the building to protest academic and administrative policies at the university, including demands to open access to all meetings and files and to abolish grade averages. Reaching approximately 350 protesters, the group gradually diminished to slightly over half that size by the time the building officially closed. A court order obtained by the university chancellor Wesley Posvar led to a peaceable relocation at 4:30 am, approximately 16 hours after the beginning of the sit-in. The approximately 70 remaining protesters moved to the ballroom of the William Pitt Union where some continued their protest. The protest had little effect, although some of the students promised more sit-ins and the group continued on, but soon after folded due to a lack of student interest. The events did prompt Posvar to attempt to hold an open hearing in the Commons Facilities Building in the spring of 1970 in order to let students air their gripes and opinions. However, the meeting was lightly attended.

On September 16, 1970, the building is named in honor of David L. Lawrence, a trustee of the university from 1945 until his death in 1966, who was also the first Catholic Governor of Pennsylvania and a mayor of Pittsburgh from 1946 to 1959 during Pittsburgh's first urban renewal program dubbed Renaissance I.

The hall housed the largest auditorium on campus which originally seated 998 people and was generally divided into two large lecture classes. Four of the first floor class rooms were also redesigned in 2013 in order to create better faculty-student interaction and a more collaborative learning space. A $7.4 million renovation of David Lawrence Hall was undertaken in 2014. The main lecture hall was split into two separate lecture halls which were reopened in 2015 with improved acoustics and capacities of 571 and 332 each. Three new 50-seat classrooms were added to the second floor mezzanine, and the main lobby was overhauled.

== Sculpture ==
Virgil Cantini's 1966 steel with bronze and glass sculpture Ode to Space sits outside the entrance to David Lawrence Hall. The sculpture contains the inscription, labore as astra or "to work toward the stars." The sculpture, weighing one ton and standing 15 feet high, was anonymously donated to the university as a memorial to Chancellor Edward Litchfield, who died in a 1965 plane crash.

Preceded by Hillman Library	University of Pittsburgh buildings David Lawrence Hall; Constructed: 1968	Succeeded by Crawford Hall
