= J. Dennis O'Connor =

American biologist (born 1942)

16th Chancellor of the University of Pittsburgh
- In office August 1, 1991 – August 1, 1995
- Preceded by: Wesley Posvar
- Succeeded by: Mark Nordenberg

Personal details
- Born: John Dennis O'Connor; 1942 Chicago, Illinois, U.S.
- Died: April 5, 2026 Washington, D.C., U.S.
- Spouse: Anne
- Children: 3
- Education: Loyola University Chicago (BS); DePaul University (MS); Northwestern University (PhD)

John Dennis O'Connor (born 1942) is an American biologist and was the sixteenth chancellor (1991–1995) of the University of Pittsburgh.

== Career ==
In addition to the University of Pittsburgh, O'Connor has held executive positions at UCLA, the University of North Carolina at Chapel Hill, the Smithsonian Institution, and the University of Maryland, College Park.

A biologist, O'Connor was on the faculty at UCLA, serving as dean of the life sciences for six years and chair of the Department of Biology for two years. At the University of North Carolina, he was vice chancellor of research and graduate studies and dean of the graduate school before being appointed vice chancellor of academic affairs, and provost in 1988.

He became chancellor at Pitt in 1991, following the retirement of Wesley Posvar. However, he resigned in 1995, after a series of disputes with the board of trustees.

O'Connor joined the Smithsonian Institution in December 1995 as the Institution's first provost. He was responsible for planning, integration and oversight of research, exhibitions, and education for the 16 museums and galleries and 6 research centers.

In 2002 the University of Maryland, College Park named him vice president for research and dean of the graduate school. He resigned this post effective July 1, 2004, and assumed the position of professor in the Department of Biology. According to the Diamondback, the University of Maryland newspaper, O'Connor was deemed responsible for overallocating graduate student fellowships, an error creating a domino effect that has left the graduate school in a multimillion-dollar deficit.

== Education ==
The Chicago native holds a bachelor's degree from Loyola University Chicago, a master's from DePaul University, and a Ph.D. from Northwestern University.

== Family ==
He is married to Anne O'Connor, a specialist in oncology nursing. They have three children.

Preceded by Wesley Posvar	University of Pittsburgh Chancellor; 1991–1995	Succeeded by Mark Nordenberg
