= Clapp Hall =

- George Hubbard Clapp Hall
- U.S. Historic district – Contributing property
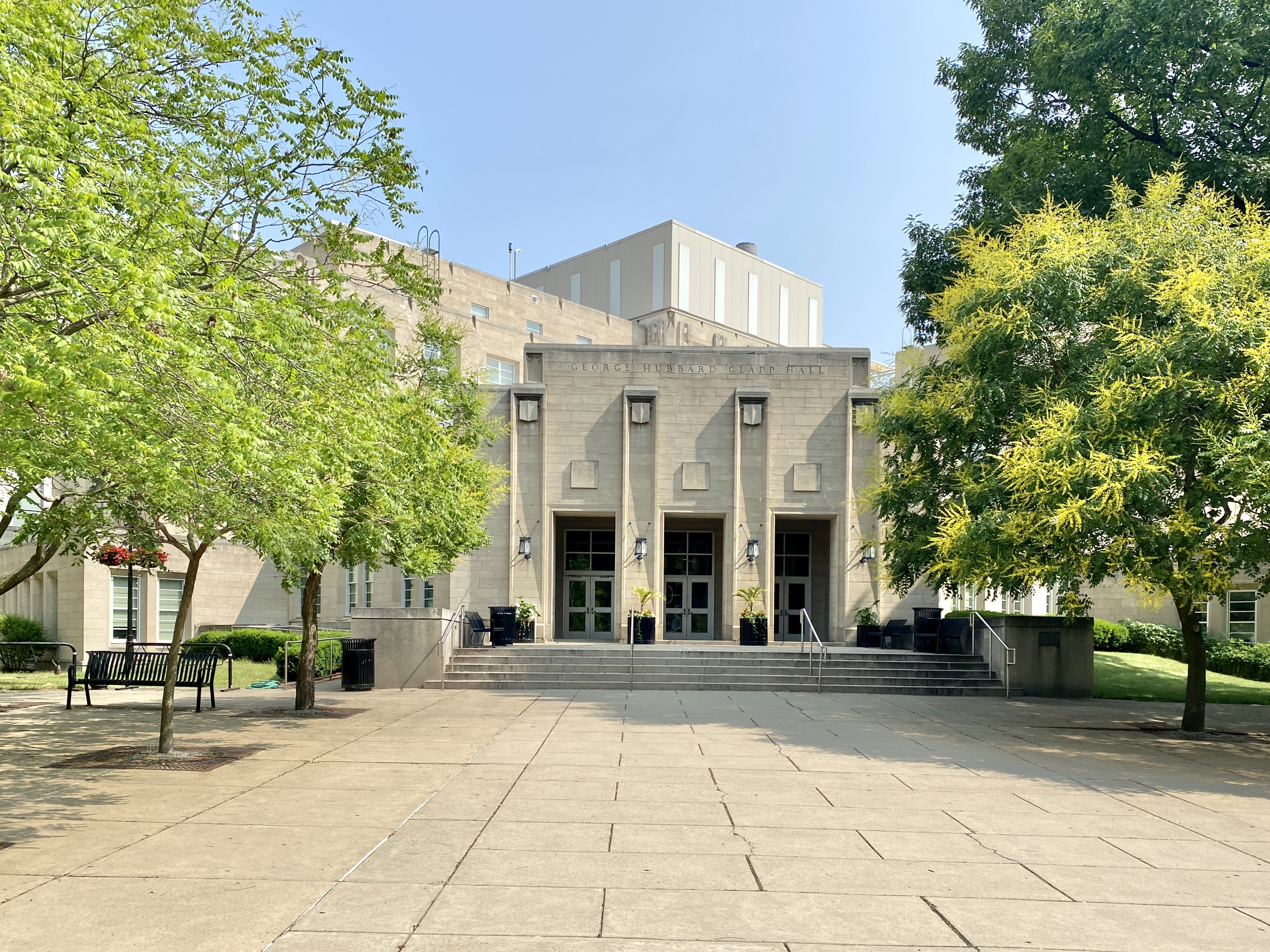
- Clapp Hall, home of the Department of Biological Sciences at the University of Pittsburgh
- Coordinates: 40°26′46.06″N 79°57′11.29″W
- Built: 1956
- Architect: Trautwein & Howard
- Architectural style: Late Gothic Revival
- Part of: Schenley Farms Historic District (ID83002213)
- Added to NRHP: July 22, 1983

George Hubbard Clapp Hall is a contributing property to the Schenley Farms National Historic District on the campus of the University of Pittsburgh in the Oakland section of Pittsburgh, Pennsylvania. The six-story Gothic Revival structure, designed by Trautwein & Howard, was completed in 1956 and serves as the primary facility of the University of Pittsburgh Department of Biological Sciences. It contains laboratories, classrooms, a greenhouse, and an amphitheater-style lecture hall with 404 seats.

== Architecture ==
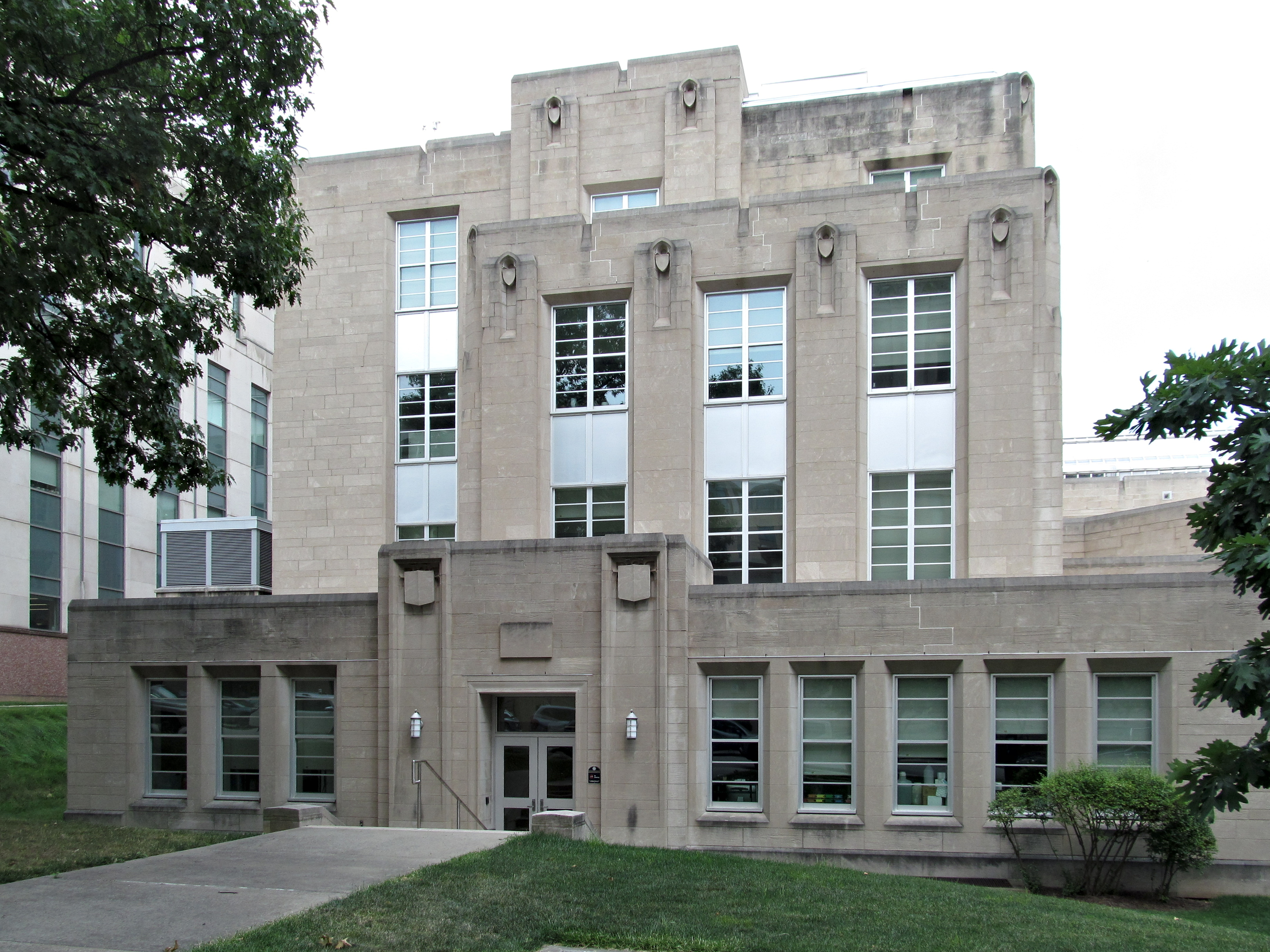
The Tennyson Avenue side of Clapp Hall

Clapp Hall was designed by Trautwein & Howard, a successor to architectural firm of Charles Klauder who designed the university's gothic Cathedral of Learning, Stephen Foster Memorial, and Heinz Memorial Chapel.

Clapp Hall's exterior and interior spaces have been described as a mix of Collegiate Gothic and Art Deco. The building features a diagonally-positioned entrance that creates a direct axis with the Cathedral of Learning which is framed in Clapp Hall's stone portal entryway. The building is clad in textured Indiana limestone to match the stone used on the Cathedral of Learning. The building's use of aluminum windows has been suggested to be a quiet homage to the work of aluminum magnate George Hubbard Clapp, the building's namesake. The lobby of Clapp Hall is streamlined Art Deco in character, with terrazzo flooring and stainless steel doors, and is thus more stylistically modern than its exterior which is meant to reflect the Cathedral of Learning. It has been suggested that the lobby reveals a struggle in the design process to find a balance between the traditional gothic and more contemporary design elements.

== History ==
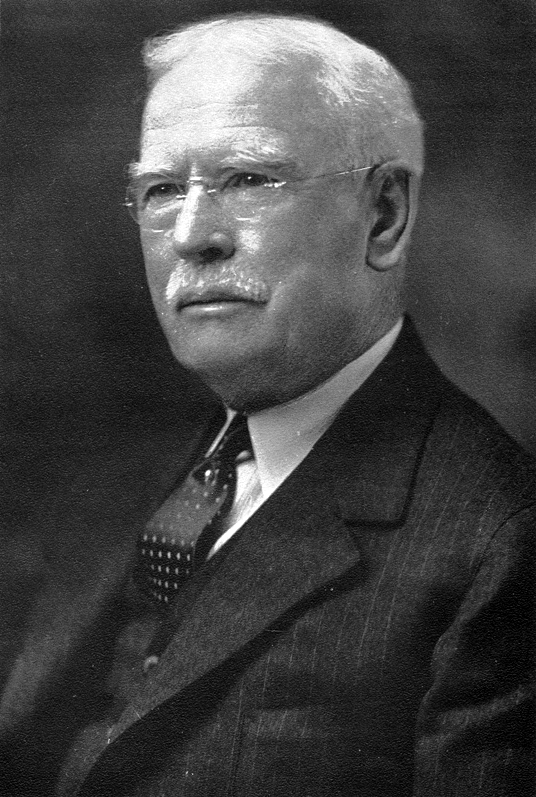
George Hubbard Clapp

Original plans slated Clapp Hall to be built adjacent to the Cathedral of Learning facing the Masonic Temple, on the south side of Fifth Avenue, between the Cathedral and Heinz Memorial Chapel. Concerns over adding more buildings to the Cathedral of Learning lawn and impinging on the lawn's rare open space prompted a change to its current site across Fifth Avenue and effectively ended above-ground development of the Cathedral lawn space.

The 3-acre (12,000 m^{2}) plot of land that Clapp Hall was constructed on was purchased for $675,000 ($8.1 million today) as a gift for the university by the A.W. Mellon Educational and Charitable Trust. Ground was broken for Clapp Hall in 1954 and the building was completed in 1956. The six-story building cost $2.5 million ($29.6 million today) and it was initially used only for freshman chemistry, although other sciences soon moved into the building. it is conjoined with Langley and Crawford Halls, which were added in later stages, and forms the three-building Clapp/Langley/Crawford Complex. The triangular courtyard at the southwest entry to Clapp Hall, facing the Cathedral of Learning, was modified in 2004 to accommodate trees and benches.

The building is named for George Hubbard Clapp (1858–1949), an alumnus (class of 1877) and president of Pitt's board of trustees for more than 40 years. Clapp was one of five responsible for the first commercial production of aluminum and was a founder of the Aluminum Company of America.

== Use ==
The six-story structure contains laboratories, classrooms, and an amphitheater-style lecture hall with 404 seats. A greenhouse, used mostly for teaching, is located on the fourth floor of Clapp Hall. Clapp Hall originally housed Pitt's Departments of Physics, Chemistry, Biology, Metallurgy, and Chemical Engineering. Today the Department of Biological Sciences occupies the building.

Preceded by Scaife Hall	University of Pittsburgh buildings Clapp Hall; Constructed: 1956	Succeeded by Parran Hall
