= University of Pittsburgh Epidemiology Data Center =

The Epidemiology Data Center (EDC) is recognized as an official University Center at the University of Pittsburgh; and is part of the Department of Epidemiology at the University of Pittsburgh Graduate School of Public Health. The EDC was formed in 1980 by Katherine M. Detre, M.D., Dr.P.H., and is currently under the co-direction of Maria Mori Brooks, Ph.D., Steven H. Belle, Ph.D. and Stephen R. Wisniewski, Ph.D.

== Overview ==
The EDC has been involved in over 120 research projects sponsored by the National Institutes of Health and other agencies. Existing studies include a scientific assortment such as registries, case control studies, and clinical trials.

The center includes 70 full-time staff, 21 faculty, and 23 part-time and student employees. Faculty and staff cover a variety of educational backgrounds, and different fields of knowledge together with biostatisticians, applied mathematical statisticians, epidemiologists, physicians, programmers, data managers, systems analysts, data entry employees, and administrative personnel.

The EDC offers IT and network services for internal & external departments or organizations within the University district. Services include: Local Area Network, Server Administration, Software, Technical & Computer Support, VAX/VMS Time Sharing, Web/Media and Information Technology services.

The Epidemiology Data Center is located at 4420 Bayard Street, Suite 600, Pittsburgh, PA 15260.

== Current research ==
LITES – Linking Investigations in Trauma and Emergency Services: The Linking Investigations in Trauma and Emergency Services (LITES) is a research network of US trauma systems and centers with the capability to conduct prospective, multicenter, injury care and outcomes research of relevance to the Department of Defense (DOD).

MINT – Myocardial Ischemia and Transfusion: MINT is a multicenter randomized clinical trial comparing red blood cell transfusion strategies for patients who have had a myocardial infarction and are anemic. The trial will enroll 3500 hospitalized patients diagnosed with myocardial infarction who are anemic (have blood counts less than 10 g/dL) to receive either a liberal or a restrictive transfusion strategy.

PTC – Pulmonary Trials Cooperative: The Pulmonary Trials Cooperative brings together research protocol leaders, clinical centers, and research participants to develop new treatments and test existing clinical management strategies.

Vit-D-Kids – Vitamin D Kids Asthma: This study will determine whether vitamin D3 helps to prevent severe asthma attacks in asthmatic children who are being treated with inhaled corticosteroids. Results from prior studies suggest that vitamin D reduces the risk of severe asthma attacks and that this protective effect may be due to immune modulation of viral illnesses or increased response to inhaled corticosteroids.

SCD-CARRE – Sickle Cell Disease and CardiovAscular Risk - Red cell Exchange Trial: The Sickle Cell Disease and Cardiovascular Risk—Red Cell Exchange (SCD-CARRE) randomized clinical trial will enroll 150 adult participants with SCD in the United States and Europe. All participants will be followed on a monthly basis for one year. The SCD-CARRE trial is supported by a grant from the National Heart, Lung, and Blood Institute.

BARI2D (Bypass Angioplasty Revascularization Investigation (BARI) 2 Diabetes: BARI2D’s program is to research whether or not patients with Type 2 Diabetes, if preliminary treatment with angioplasty or bypass surgical treatment is superior to preliminary treatment within a medical program. BARI2D includes comparison with two approaches to manage blood sugar: on condition that providing insulin stimulating meds or meds that sensitizes the body to on hand insulin
