= Stanton Crawford =

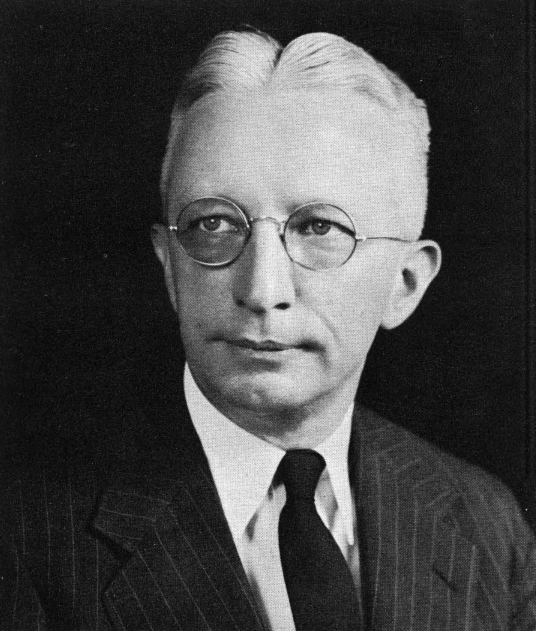

13th Chancellor of the University of Pittsburgh
- In office July 1965 – January 26, 1966
- Preceded by: Edward H. Litchfield
- Succeeded by: David Kurtzman

Personal details
- Born: Stanton Chapman Crawford; October 30, 1897; Steubenville, Ohio, U.S.
- Died: January 26, 1966 (aged 68); Pittsburgh, Pennsylvania, U.S.

Stanton Chapman Crawford (October 30, 1897 – January 26, 1966) was the thirteenth Chancellor (July 1965 – January 1966) of the University of Pittsburgh.

He was appointed Acting Chancellor, somewhat unwillingly due to health concerns, following the departure of Edward Litchfield. Crawford died of a heart attack January 26, 1966. The university honored him with the title of 13th Chancellor four months after his death.

Crawford first moved to Pittsburgh in 1922 as a graduate student. He received his doctorate in 1926 in zoology at the University of Pittsburgh, and became an instructor and eventually professor of biology starting in 1924. He served as Dean of the College of Arts and Sciences from 1935 to 1956 and served as Secretary of the university and Dean of the Faculties.

Crawford Hall, completed in 1968 on Tennyson Avenue on Pitt's campus, is named in his honor.

Preceded by Edward Litchfield	University of Pittsburgh Chancellor; 1965–1966	Succeeded by David Kurtzman
