= David Kurtzman =

American politician (1904–1977)

- Kurtzman

14th Chancellor of the University of Pittsburgh
- In office January 26, 1966 – June 1, 1967
- Preceded by: Stanton Crawford
- Succeeded by: Wesley Posvar

Secretary of Education of Pennsylvania
- In office June 1967 – 1971
- Governor: Raymond P. Shafer; Milton Shapp
- Preceded by: J. Ralph Rackley
- Succeeded by: John Pittenger

Personal details
- Born: January 11, 1904 Odessa, Imperial Russia (now Odesa, Ukraine)
- Died: February 22, 1977 (aged 74) Pittsburgh, Pennsylvania, U.S.
- Education: Temple University (BA); University of Pennsylvania (MA, PhD)

David Harold Kurtzman (January 11, 1904 – February 22, 1977) was the fourteenth chancellor (1966–1967) of the University of Pittsburgh, and the last Superintendent of Public Instruction and first Secretary of Education (1967–1971) of the Commonwealth of Pennsylvania.

== Biography ==
Kurtzman became the University of Pittsburgh's vice chancellor for finance in July 1965, "at the height of a financial crisis at the University."

He was appointed acting chancellor after Stanton Crawford's sudden death of a heart attack seven months later, on January 26, 1966. Kurtzman's administration negotiated the Commonwealth of Pennsylvania's bailout of the university, through which the university became a state-related institution on August 23, 1966.

According to his obituary, ten years later, as the university continued its search for a permanent chancellor after the bailout, "trustees were heard to say 'If Dave Kurtzman were 10 years younger, we might not be looking.' Then 63, Dr. Kurtzman was two years short of the mandatory retirement age."

On January 13, 1967, the Board of Trustees announced its selection of Wesley Posvar as its new Chancellor, effective June 1, and promoted Kurtzman to the full rank of chancellor until then, and chancellor emeritus afterward.

A ballroom in the university's William Pitt Union was named in his honor.

Kurtzman was born near Odessa, Ukraine, in then-czarist Russia, eventually immigrating to the United States in 1921. Although he did not start high school until the age of nineteen, he finished in under two years, and subsequently earned an undergraduate degree in accounting from Temple University and an M.A. and a Ph.D. in political science at the University of Pennsylvania.

He worked for many years at the Pennsylvania Economy League. There, he served as a key aide to David L. Lawrence, mayor of Pittsburgh, and Richard King Mellon, financier, in their effort to build the city's first renaissance after World War II.

Kurtzman joined the newly elected Governor Lawrence in 1959 in Harrisburg, Pennsylvania as his secretary of administration.

After his time at Pitt, Kurtzman returned to Harrisburg in 1967 as State Superintendent of Public Instruction (later Secretary of Education) under Governors Raymond P. Shafer and Milton Shapp; in this role he became the named respondent in the landmark US Supreme Court decision Lemon v. Kurtzman.

Academic offices
| Preceded by Stanton Crawford | 14th University of Pittsburgh Chancellor; 1966–1967 | Succeeded by Wesley Posvar | | | |
| Government offices |- | | | Unknown | Pennsylvania Secretary of Administration; 1959–1963 | Unknown |
| Preceded by J. Ralph Rackley as Superintendent of Public Instruction | Pennsylvania Secretary of Education; 1967–1971 | Succeeded by John Pittenger | | | |
