= Virgil Cantini =

American sculptor (1919–2009)

Virgil D. Cantini
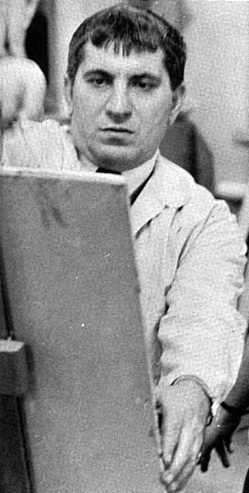
- Virgil Cantini instructing a class at the University of Pittsburgh during the 1956-57 school year
- Born: February 28, 1919; Italy
- Died: May 2, 2009 (aged 90); Pittsburgh
- Education: Manhattan College, BFA, Carnegie Mellon University, MFA, University of Pittsburgh; Hon. D., Duquesne University
- Known for: Enamelist, Sculptor
- Notable work: "Man" sculpture (1965) "Joy of Life" (1969)
- Awards: Time Magazine "Hundred Leaders of Tomorrow" (1953); Guggenheim Fellowship (1957); Pope Paul VI Bishop's Medal (1964); Davinci Medal (1968)

Virgil David Cantini (February 28, 1919 – May 2, 2009) was an American enamelist, sculptor and educator. He was well known for innovation with enamel and steel and received both local and national recognition for his work, including honorary awards, competitive prizes and commissions, along with a Guggenheim Fellowship in 1957. Cantini long served as a faculty member at the University of Pittsburgh, where he helped to create the Department of Studio Arts. A longtime resident of the Oakland neighborhood of Pittsburgh, Pennsylvania, Cantini died on May 2, 2009, at the age of 90. Today, many of his large scale works are on display throughout the city of Pittsburgh.

== Life ==
A native of Italy, Cantini and his family emigrated to Weirton, West Virginia, in the 1920s. He initially attended Manhattan College in New York before transferring to Carnegie Institute of Technology (now Carnegie Mellon) where he received a football scholarship and earned All-America status as a quarterback. His studies were interrupted by World War II, in which he served the Army making topographical maps and models in North Africa.

Following the war, Cantini received a bachelor's degree in fine arts in 1946 from Carnegie Tech and married a fellow art student, Lucille Kleber. Cantini went on to earn a master's in fine arts at the University of Pittsburgh in 1948, and was granted an honorary doctorate in fine arts from Duquesne University in 1982.

Cantini and Lucille settled in the Oakland neighborhood of Pittsburgh, where they had two daughters, Maria and Lisa, and lived for 60 years. His home on the 200 block of South Craig Street also served as his studio and gallery.

Beginning in 1948, Cantini's artwork gained national exposure when his enamel "Masquerade" was juried at the 13th National Ceramic Exhibition in Syracuse, New York. In 1953, he was named one of the "Hundred Leaders of Tomorrow" by Time magazine. In 1956, the Pittsburgh Center for the Arts named Cantini the region's Artist of the Year, and he was awarded a Guggenheim Fellowship in 1957. By 1959, Cantini was considered among the most prominent contemporary enamelists, with his work included regularly in New York's Museum of Contemporary Crafts exhibitions. Cantini was awarded the Pope Paul VI Bishop's Medal in 1964 for "outstanding contribution in the field of liturgical art", and in 1968, he was awarded the Davinci Medal by the Cultural Heritage Foundation of the Italian Sons & Daughters of America.

Cantini taught at the University of Pittsburgh for 38 years, retiring in 1989. He was the first chair of the Department of Studio Arts, which he is credited with establishing. He also served on the University's Athletic Committee in the 1970s. Cantini formerly served as the chair of the Department of Art, and served as Professor of Studio Arts, Emeritus until his death.

== Partial list of works ==
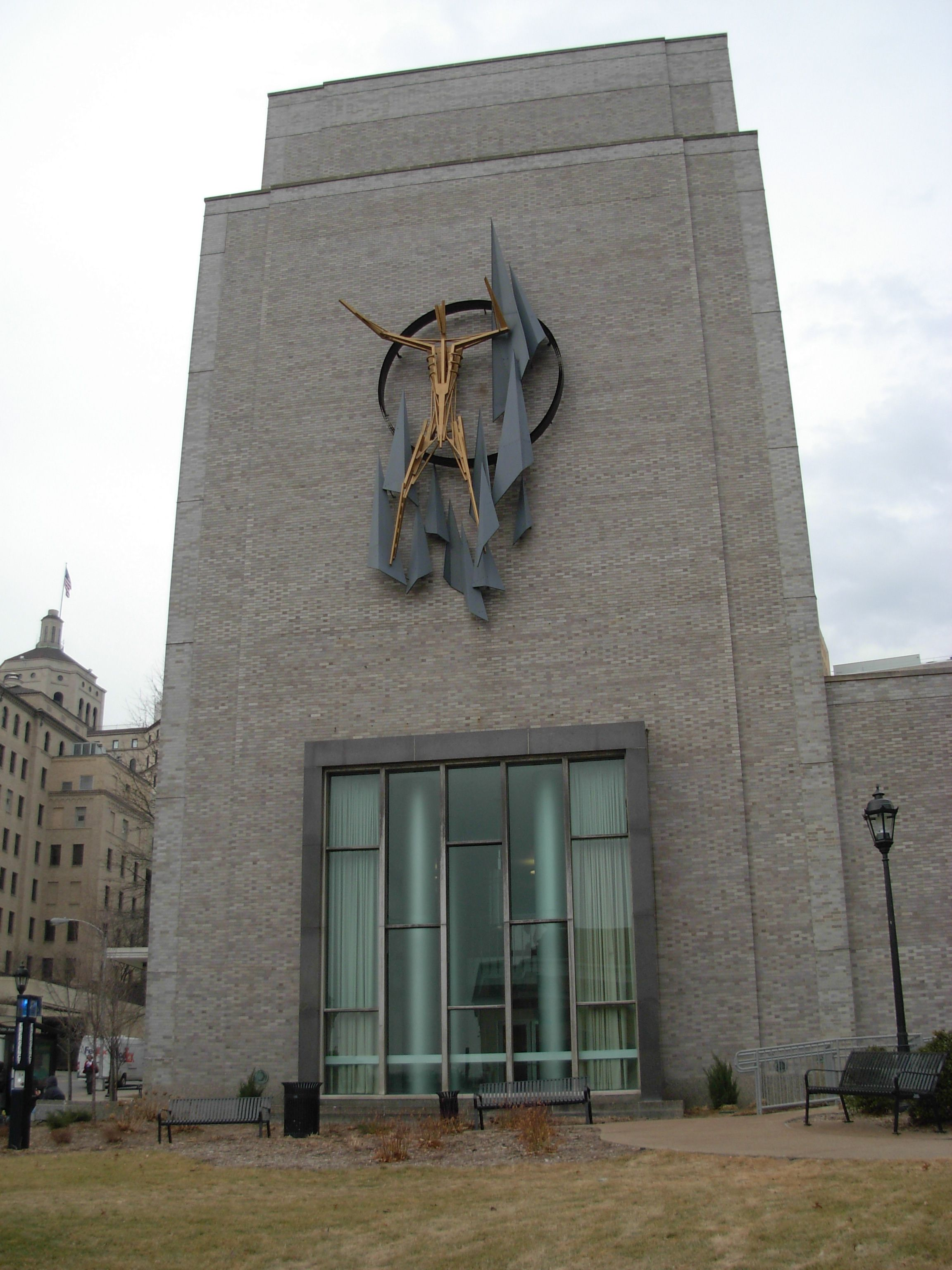
The Man sculpture by Virgil Cantini on the facade of Parran Hall.

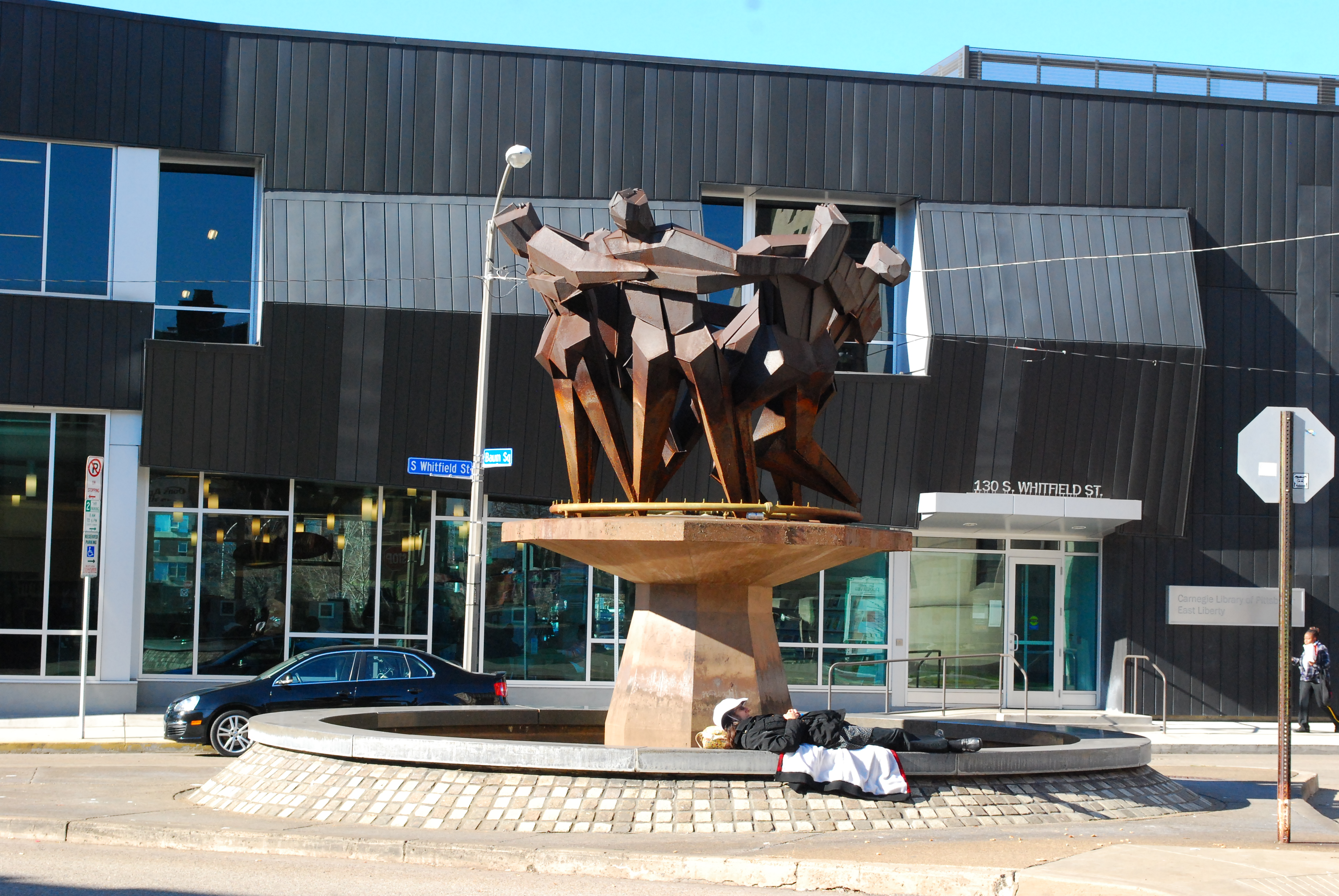
The Joy of Life in East Liberty, Pittsburgh, PA

24 by 36 foot Mosaic, Teplitz Memorial Moot Courtroom, Barco Law Building, University of Pittsburgh School of Law

Side view of Science and Mankind mural in the Chevron Science Center.

- 24 by 36 foot Mosaic, Teplitz Memorial Moot Courtroom, Barco Law Building, University of Pittsburgh School of Law, representing the artist's conception of the harmony of the law and the rich tapestry of the American legal system
- Mosaic Tunnel, Glass mosaic (1964), Pedestrian tunnel behind U.S. Steel Tower, beneath Bigelow Boulevard, downtown Pittsburgh.
- Man, Bronze and Steel sculpture (1965), Parran Hall facade, University of Pittsburgh, Graduate School of Public Health. Cantini designed Man as a sculpture referring to the body, knowledge, and health.
- Ode to Space, Steel with bronze and glass sculpture (1966), Forbes Avenue at University of Pittsburgh. Dedicated as a tribute to Chancellor Edward Litchfield, who died in a plane crash in 1968.
- Joy of Life, Cor-Ten steel sculpture (1969), East Liberty Mall at Penn and Highland Avenues, Pittsburgh. Joy of Life has been relocated to a nearby traffic island, at another corner of the East Liberty Presbyterian Church, at South Whitfield Street and Baum Boulevard.
- Aerial Scape, Skyscape, Porcelain enamel (1970), One Oliver Plaza, Rear Lobby, 210 Sixth Avenue, downtown Pittsburgh. Rear lobby of One Oliver Plaza is to be remodeled in 2009 and the artwork has been given as a gift to the University of Pittsburgh. Will be relocated to Posvar Hall.
- Science and Mankind, Porcelain enamel mural (1973) in Chevron Science Center at the University of Pittsburgh is said to be his proudest work.
- Enlightenment and Joy, porcelain enamel mural (1977) entrance to Wesley W. Posvar Hall University of Pittsburgh. The vibrant colors are the result of several layers of paint on each individual tile.
- Large enamel painting framing a crucifix and enamel paintings of the 14 Stations of the Cross, originally in St. Henry Church in the Arlington neighborhood of Pittsburgh, Pennsylvania, moved to the now failed art museum at the Pope John Paul II Cultural Center in Washington, D.C.
- Enamel and steel sculpture featured in the entrance vestibule of the New Castle YMCA. Commissioned in 1964 it was installed as a memorial to Dr. Paul H. Wilson. Featuring rays emanating from a large piece of glass, the sculpture represents the Bible verse 'I am the light' and symbolizes the concept of Christianity spread by the YMCA.

== See also ==
- Parran Hall
- Wesley W. Posvar Hall
- Chevron Science Center
- Barco Law Building
- David Lawrence Hall (University of Pittsburgh)
