= Clapp/Langley/Crawford Complex =

Buildings at the University of Pittsburgh in the US

Coordinates: 40°26′48″N 79°57′14″W

The Clapp-Langley-Crawford halls complex (often referred to as CLC) comprises three inter-connected buildings (Clapp, Langley, and Crawford Halls) and the Life Science Annex that house the Department of Biological Science and the Department of Neuroscience at the University of Pittsburgh in Pittsburgh, Pennsylvania, United States.

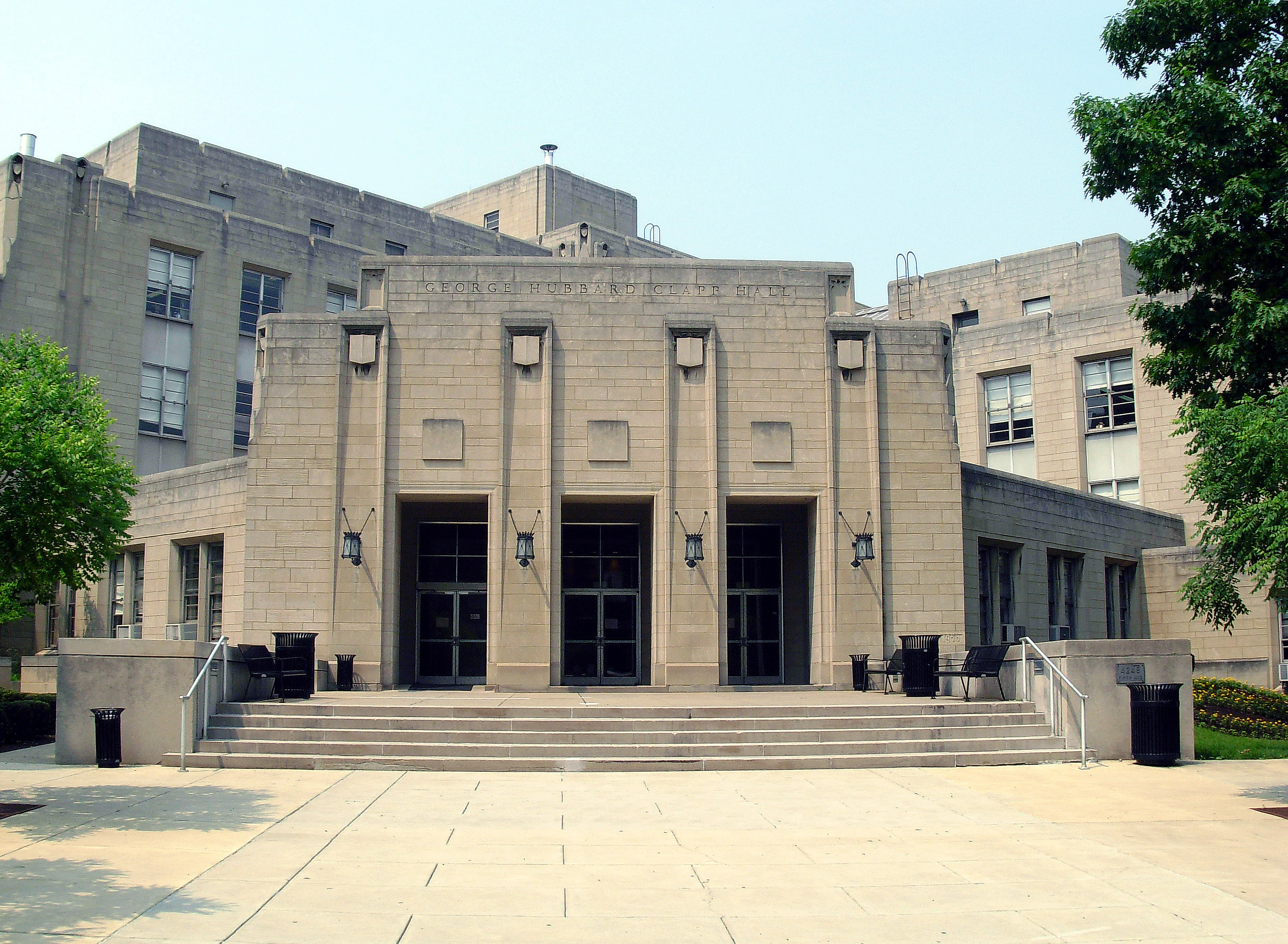
Clapp Hall at the University of Pittsburgh

== Clapp Hall ==
George Hubbard Clapp Hall is a contributing property to the Schenley Farms National Historic District. The six-story Gothic Revival structure, designed by Trautwein & Howard, was completed in 1956 and serves as the primary facility of the University of Pittsburgh Department of Biological Sciences. It contains laboratories, classrooms, a greenhouse, and an amphitheater-style lecture hall with 404 seats.

== Langley Hall ==
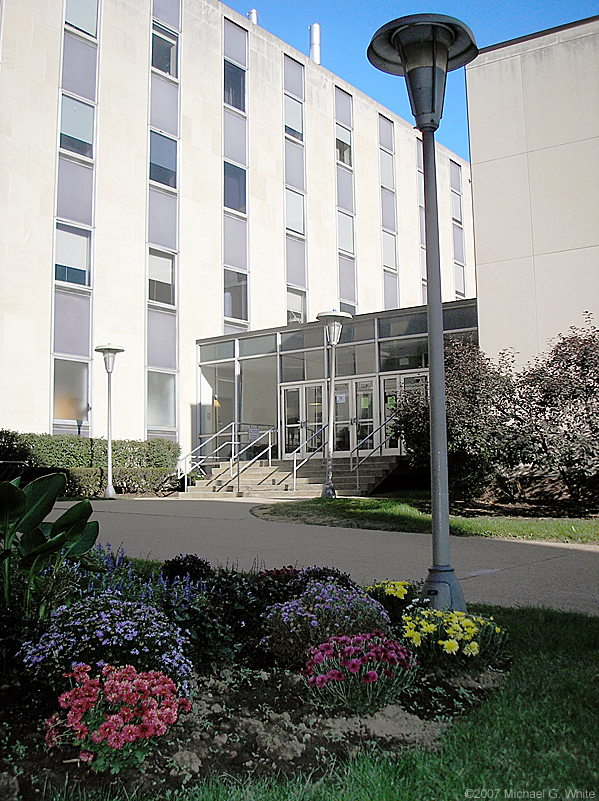
Entrance to Langley Hall at the University of Pittsburgh.

Langley Hall is the second unit of the natural science quadrangle (along with Clapp Hall and Crawford Hall). Langley Hall is named after Samuel Pierpont Langley, a former University of Pittsburgh professor who was a renowned astronomer, an aviation pioneer, and the director of Allegheny Observatory.

Langley Hall's construction was begun in 1959 made possible by a $2.5 million grant ($27 million today) from the General State Authority. Completed in 1961 in the International Style, Langley Hall was originally the home of the Department of Geology, Department of Psychology, and the Department of Biology, (now part of the Department of Biological Sciences).. It was originally conceived as an annex to Clapp Hall, to which it is connected on the south side. For this reason, the room numbers in Langley Hall all begin with the letter 'A' to denote 'Annex.' The Department of Biological Sciences occupies the First, Second, Third, and Fifth floors of Langley Hall. Crawford Hall, home of the Department of Neuroscience, is connect to Langley Hall's north side, together forming the 3-building CLC complex that is devoted to the biological sciences, housing both biological sciences and neuroscience lectures and research laboratories. A research greenhouse composed of four bays is located on Langley Hall's sixth floor.

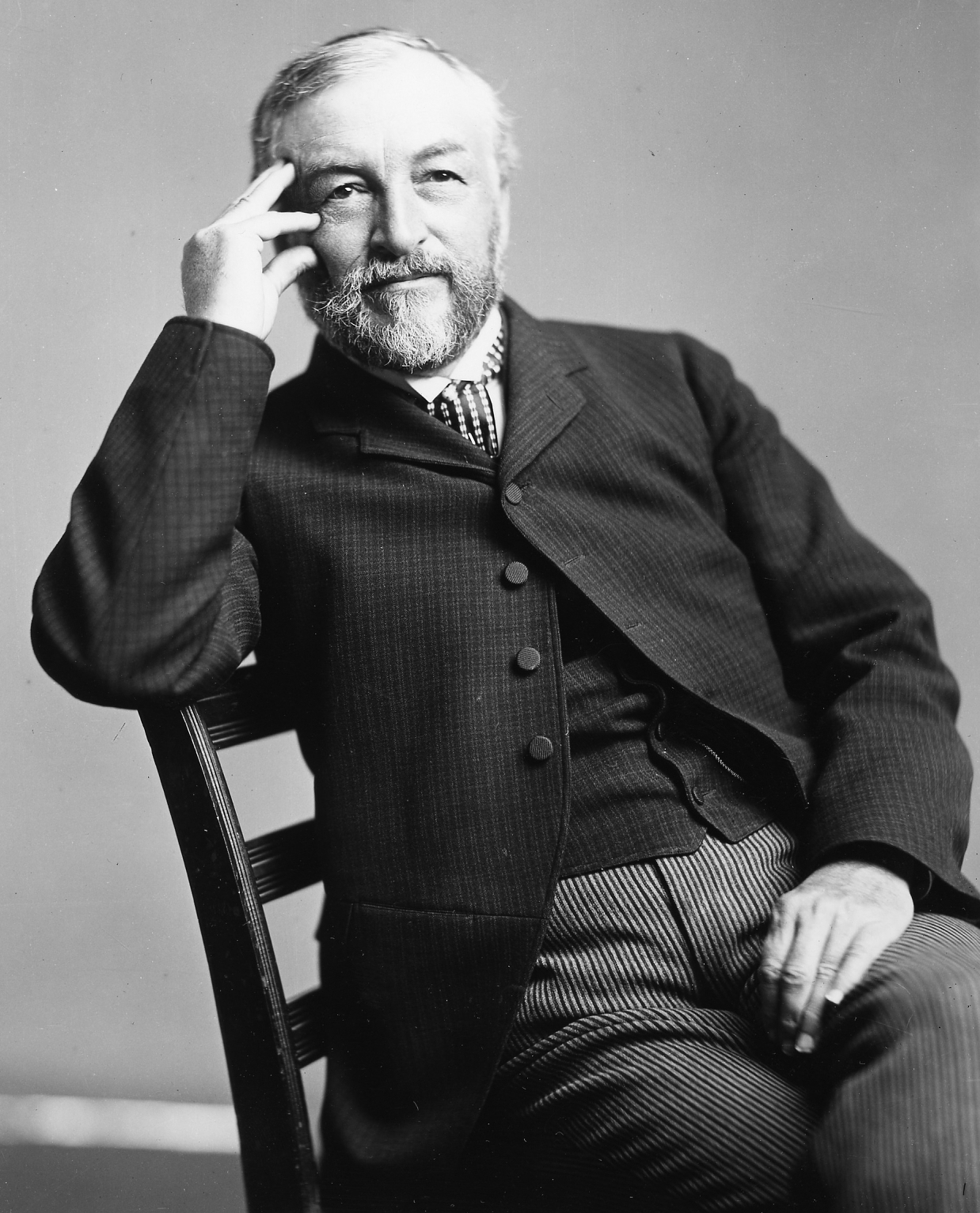
Samuel Langley

Langley Hall also contains Langley Library that is the biology, neuroscience, psychology, and life sciences unit of the University Library System at Pitt. The library holds more than 77,000 bound volumes on site, and maintains over 650 current journal subscriptions. Several prominent journals are also available on the World Wide Web. The library holdings range from volumes, dissertations, monographs, and journals in every topic in the biological sciences, covering both basic and advanced topics. The library conducts courses on using computers for research/literature searches in the biological sciences and has 13 computers for this purpose. More than 130,000 patrons enter the library each year, checking out some 24,000 items. Langley Library has a capacity of 102, and is typically open 75.5 hours each week.

On January 20, 1977, two women were killed and several people injured in a gas explosion that destroyed part of Langley Hall. Coroner Cyril Wecht, after a two-day inquest, ruled the explosion an accident. Langley Hall was rebuilt and then reopened in 1982.

In 2011 a $2 million greenhouse was opened on the sixth-level roof Langley Hall where it connects to Clapp Hall. The greenhouse features two zones with mobile plant benches and a computerized environmental control system, including a fogging system, cooling units, motorized retractable shades and heat retention roof curtains, and motor controlled light fixtures of multiple types to facilitate the regulation of temperature, humidity, and light. In addition, renovation plans were announced that include the installation of a biosafety level-3 facility that incorporates what are perhaps first in the nation features, such an observation room and monitoring cameras, to facilitate undergraduate learning.

Preceded by Parran Hall	University of Pittsburgh buildings Langley Hall; Constructed: 1959-1961	Succeeded by Trees Hall

== Crawford Hall ==
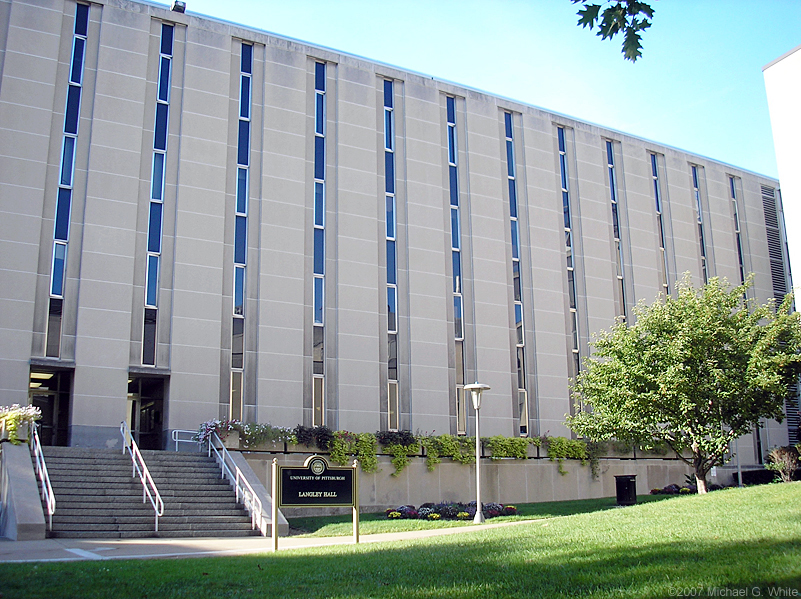
Crawford Hall, home of the Department of Neuroscience at the University of Pittsburgh.

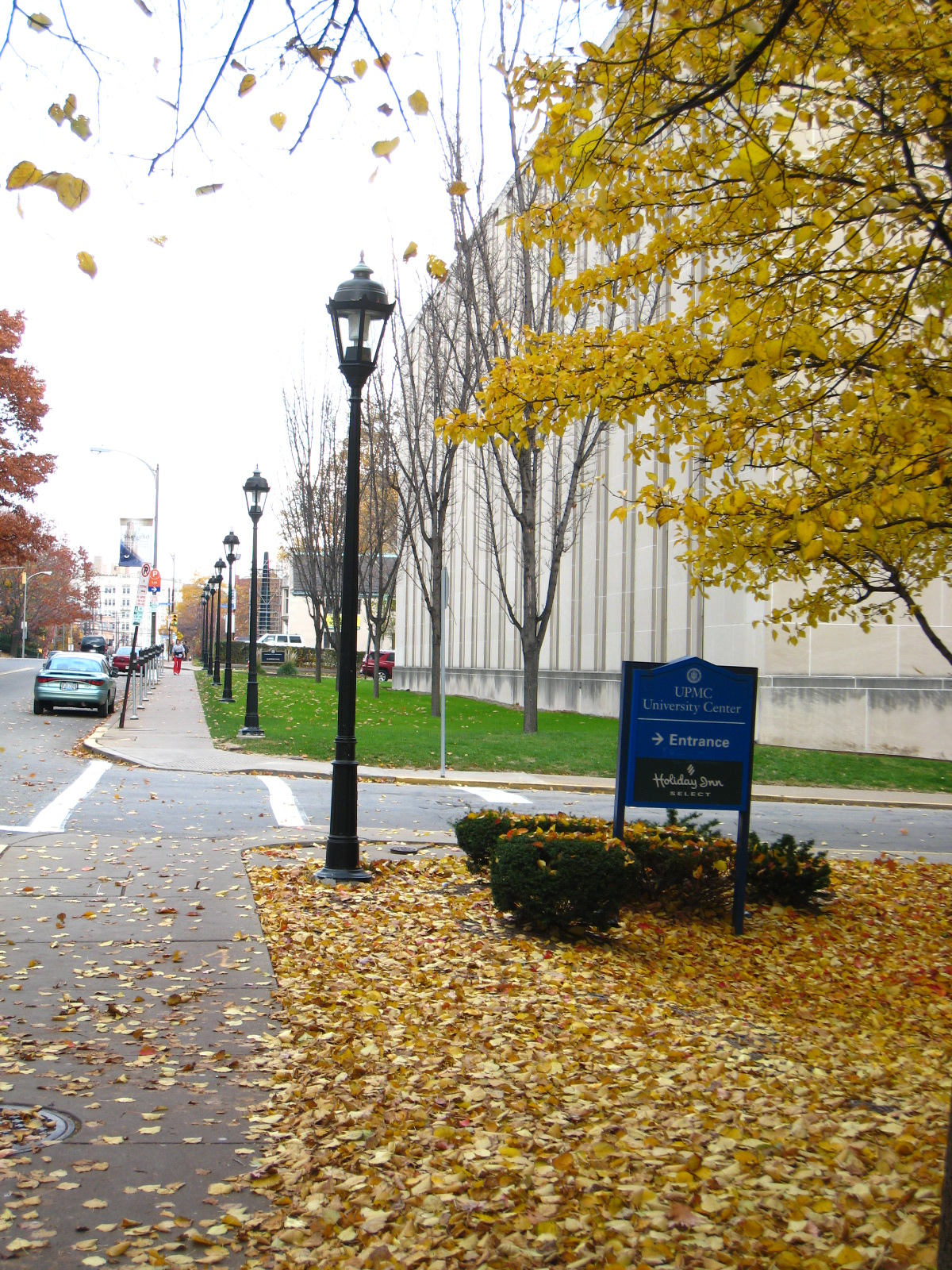
Crawford Hall along Bigelow Boulevard

Crawford Hall is home to the Department of Neuroscience at the University of Pittsburgh. Designed in the international style by Kuhn, Newcomer & Valentour, it is the last of the three main buildings to be constructed. Crawford Hall's construction was begun in 1966 and the $3.8 million ($36.8 million today) building was completed and dedicated in 1969. It was originally the home of the Department of Chemistry, the Department of Psychology, and the Department of Biophysics and Microbiology (now part of the Department of Biological Sciences). Crawford Hall is named after Stanton C. Crawford, former Dean and 13th Chancellor of the University of Pittsburgh, whose scientific specialty was Biology.

Preceded by David Lawrence Hall	University of Pittsburgh buildings Crawford Hall; Constructed: 1966-1969	Succeeded by Benedum Hall

== Life Science Annex ==
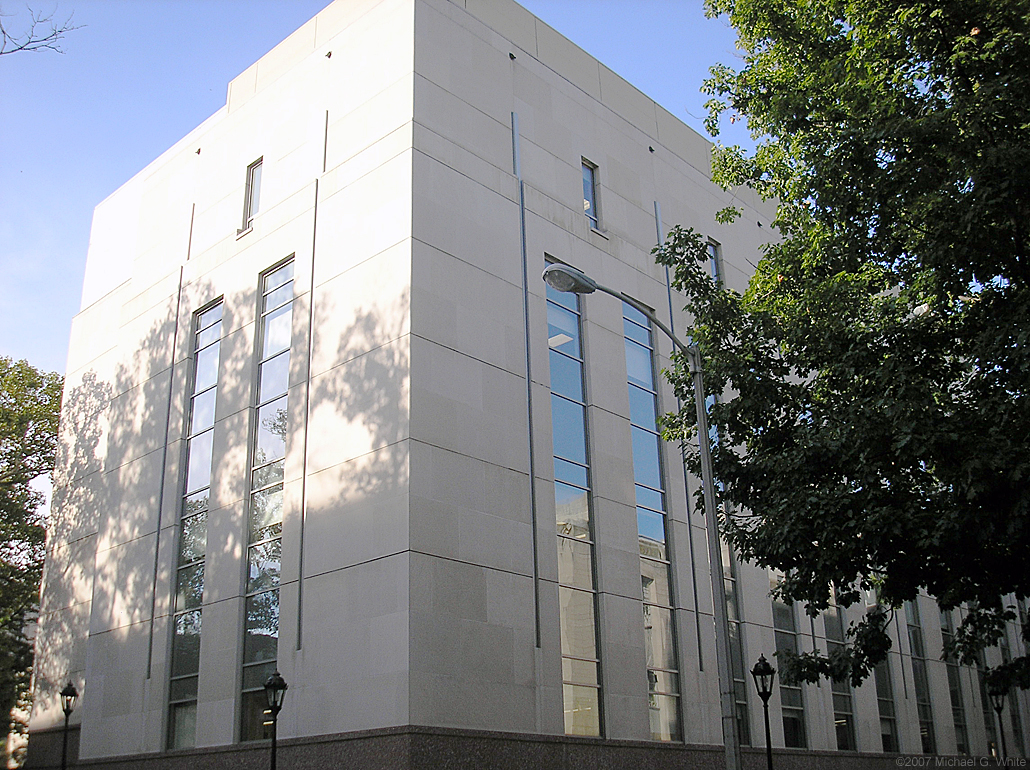
Life Science Annex, the newest addition to the CLC complex at the University of Pittsburgh.

The Life Science Annex, a $25.5 million expansion ($38.7 million today) of the Clapp/Langley/Crawford (CLC) halls complex designed by Burt Hill Architects , officially opened in October 2007. Indiana limestone cladding panels were utilized to approximate as closely as possible the exterior appearance of the adjacent buildings in the CLC complex. The Life Science Annex addition is the first phase of a multi-phase upgrade of the CLC complex and has added 50,000 gross sq. ft. to house biological sciences laboratories, neuroscience research programs and support areas such as cold rooms, constant temperature rooms, computer areas and other auxiliary spaces. Renovation of some of the CLC’s systems infrastructure also was included in the project
