= Wesley Posvar =

American academic (1925–2001)

15th Chancellor of the University of Pittsburgh
- In office June 1, 1967 – July 31, 1991
- Preceded by: David Kurtzman
- Succeeded by: J. Dennis O'Connor

Personal details
- Born: Wesley Wentz Posvar; September 14, 1925 Topeka, Kansas, U.S.
- Died: July 27, 2001 (aged 75) Latrobe, Pennsylvania, U.S.
- Spouse: Mildred Miller
- Education: United States Military Academy; University of Oxford (BA, MA); Harvard University (MPA, PhD)

Military service
- Allegiance: United States
- Branch/service: United States Air Force
- Rank: Brigadier General

Wesley Wentz Posvar (1925–2001) was the fifteenth Chancellor (1967–1991) of the University of Pittsburgh.

== Biography ==
Posvar was born September 14, 1925, in Topeka, Kansas. He attended West Point, was senior Air Cadet, and graduated first in his class in 1946, and after graduation he joined the U.S. Army Air Corps, which later became the U.S. Air Force. He was the first Air Force officer to receive a Rhodes Scholarship, earning both a bachelor's and master's at Oxford University. At Harvard University he earned a master's in public administration and a Ph.D. in political science. Posvar achieved the Air Force rank of brigadier general.

After his retirement from the United States Air Force, he became President of the University of Pittsburgh.

On July 31, 1991, Wesley W. Posvar officially retired from his post as chancellor of the University of Pittsburgh after 24 years. Posvar was married to Mildred Miller, New York Metropolitan Opera star and recital mezzo-soprano, with whom he had three children, Wesley, Marina and Lisa. Posvar died of a heart attack on July 27, 2001. He was buried with full military honors at the U.S. Military Academy at West Point.

Posvar was Chairman of the Department of Political Science at the Air Force Academy. He was one of the closest friends of the science fiction writer Robert A.Heinlein, who lived in Colorado Springs during the time that Posvar was a professor at the Academy.

== University of Pittsburgh ==
His administration is best known for elimination of the university's debt from its 1960s financial crisis and for raising the school's prestige and endowment. Under Posvar, Pitt's operating budget grew sevenfold to $630 million and its endowment tripled to $257 million. He also established the Honors College, the School of Health-Related Professions, the University Center for International Studies, the Center for Philosophy of Science, and the University Center for Social and Urban Research.

In 2000 Pitt's Forbes Quadrangle building, on the site of the former Forbes Field, was renamed Wesley W. Posvar Hall in his honor. A room is also dedicated in Posvar’s honor at the Thayer Hotel at West Point.

Preceded by David Kurtzman	University of Pittsburgh Chancellor; 1967–1991	Succeeded by J. Dennis O'Connor
