= Maureen Lichtveld =

American epidemiologist

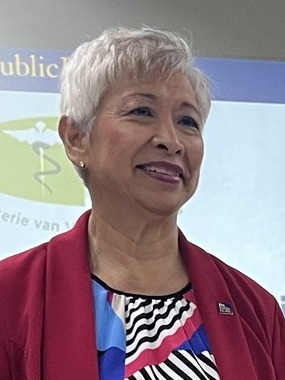
- Lichtveld in 2025
- Born: Suriname

Academic background
- Education: MPH, Johns Hopkins Bloomberg School of Public Health; MD, Anton de Kom University of Suriname/Leiden University

Academic work
- Institutions: University of Pittsburgh Graduate School of Public Health; Tulane University School of Public Health and Tropical Medicine

Maureen Yvette Lichtveld is an American epidemiologist. She is the dean at the University of Pittsburgh Graduate School of Public Health.

== Early life and education ==
Lichtveld was born in Suriname, where she attended the Anton de Kom University of Suriname and the Leiden University for her medical degree. She then moved to the United States and enrolled at the Johns Hopkins Bloomberg School of Public Health. At the age of 23, she became the youngest and first female physician to work directly in the Amazon rainforest.

== Career ==
Upon completing her medical degree, Lichtveld spent 18 years with the Centers for Disease Control and Prevention and the Agency for Toxic Substances and Disease Registry before joining Tulane University School of Public Health and Tropical Medicine in 2005. Throughout her CDC career, she was involved in discussions to create the Strategic National Stockpile, a repository of drugs, vaccines, and medical supplies, following the September 11 attacks. In recognition of her work, she received the Special Service Award, Public Health Service Special Recognition Award, and CDC Environmental Health Scientist of the Year.

During her early tenure at Tulane, Lichtveld signed a memorandum of understanding with the Anton de Kom Universiteit van Suriname to commit to inter-institutional exchanges of faculty members for research, lectures, and discussions; exchanges of research scientists and graduate students for study and research. She received the 2008 Herbert Nickens Award from the National Intercultural Cancer Council for leadership in cancer health disparities and educating minority health professionals in cancer care. Following this honor, Lichtveld chaired Tulane's Flu Emergency Task Force which worked in collaboration with the Tulane's Office of Emergency Response and the School of Public Health and Tropical Medicine's Office of Global Health during the Influenza A virus subtype H1N1 epidemic.

In 2011, Lichtveld was named the Principal investigator of a five-year study to explore the potential health impacts of the Deepwater Horizon oil spill on pregnant women and women of reproductive age living in Louisiana's coastal parishes. She also became the director of the Center for Gulf Coast Environmental Health Research, Leadership and Strategic Initiatives to "lead the development and implementation of innovative disaster management, health promotion, and disease prevention strategies to enhance the health and well-being of Gulf Coast communities." In recognition of her efforts, Lichtveld was inducted into Hopkins Society of Scholars and National Academy of Medicine.

In her final year at Tulane, Lichtveld became the principal investigator of a new project with the United Houma Nation. The aim of the project was "to enable the United Houma Nation to determine how to support its citizens to adapt to climate-related and other short- and long-term stressors while maintaining the integrity of its community and culture." She was also selected to join the Johns Hopkins School of Nursing Advisory Board. Lichtveld left Tulane in 2021 to accept a position as dean at the University of Pittsburgh Graduate School of Public Health. During the COVID-19 pandemic, she advocated for the dissemination of the COVID-19 vaccine.
