= Parran Hall =

Building in Pennsylvania, United States

Coordinates: 40°26′34″N 79°57′30″W

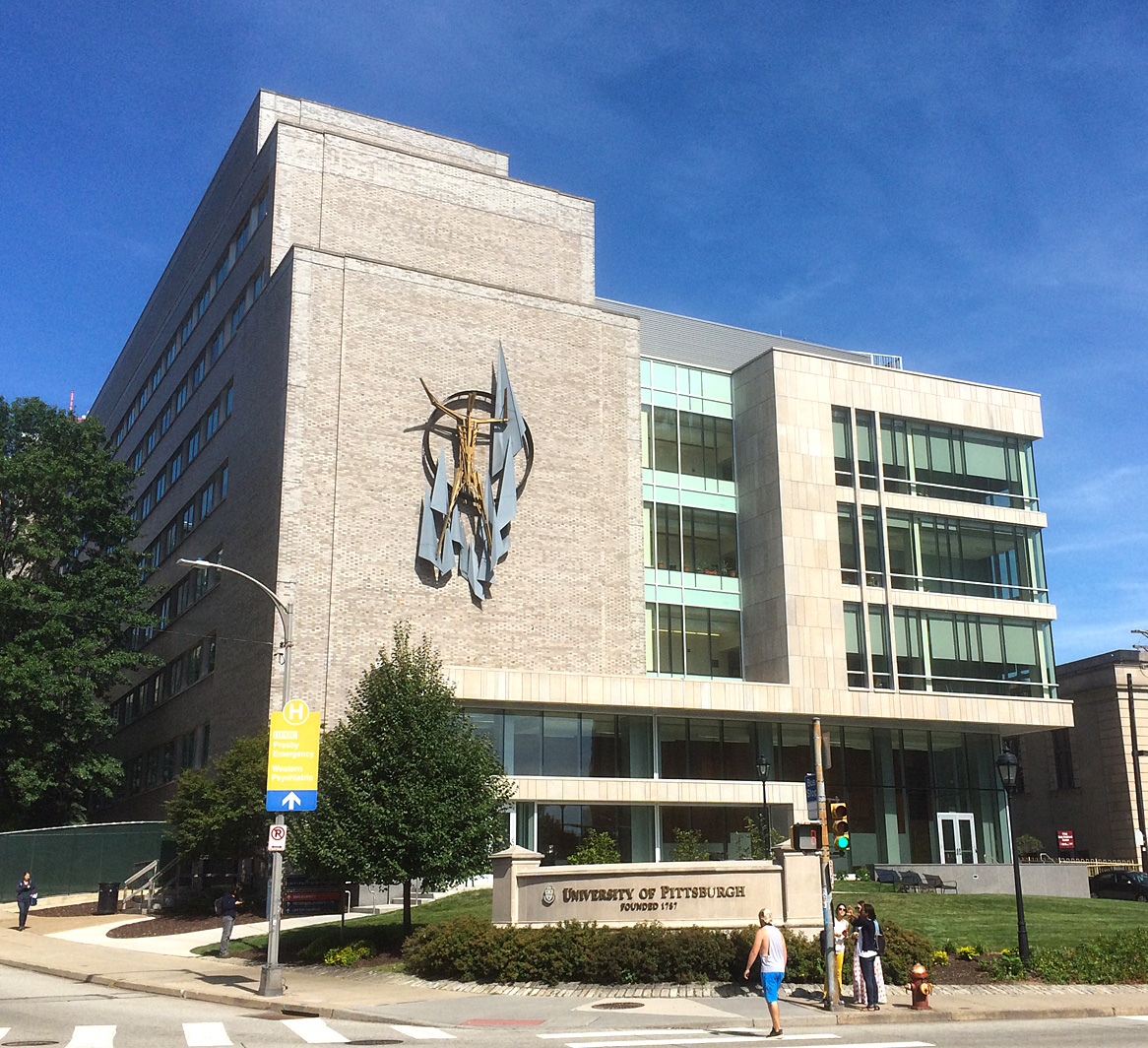
The former Parran Hall, home of the Graduate School of Public Health at the University of Pittsburgh

Parran Hall is the former name of an academic building on the campus of the University of Pittsburgh on Fifth Avenue in Pittsburgh, Pennsylvania, United States. The building, constructed to house the Graduate School of Public Health, was completed in 1957, and designed by Eggers & Higgins, architects of the Dirksen Senate Office Building, in the International Style with a major addition by Deeter-Ritchey-Sippel and Crump completed in 1967. The school was founded in 1948 with a $13.6 million grant ($182.2 million today) from the A.W. Mellon Educational and Charitable Trust. It was originally named after Thomas Parran Jr., a former head of the United States Public Health Service at the time the Public Health Service was sponsoring the Tuskegee experiment, in which patients with syphilis were studied but did not receive treatment for the disease.

The nine-story building is the primary home of the Graduate School of Public Health. The building encompasses an entire city block bounded by Fifth Avenue, Bouquet, O'Hara, and DeSoto Streets. It contains a 282 seat auditorium, lounge, administrative offices, seminar rooms, classrooms, and faculty offices.

== Thomas Parran ==
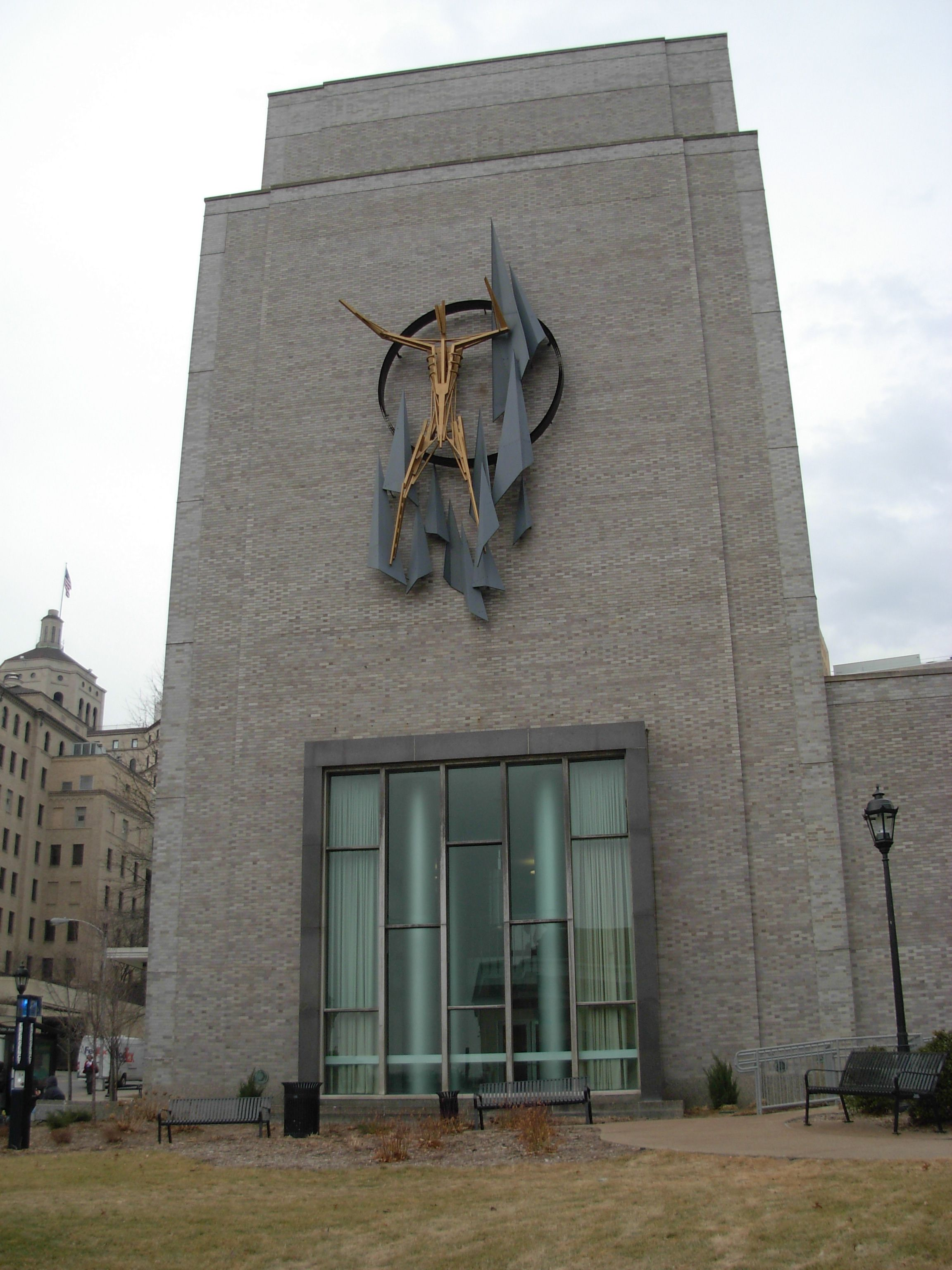
The "Man" sculpture by Virgil Cantini on the facade of the Public Health Building (former Parran Hall).

The building was renamed in 1969 to honor Thomas Parran, Jr., former Surgeon General of the United States. Following a career as the health commissioner of New York State and three four-year terms as U.S. Surgeon General, Thomas Parran came to Pitt to help establish the Graduate School of Public Health. He was internationally renowned for programs such as one to expose and stamp out syphilis, but led now-reviled experiments that infected black men with diseases including syphilis and left them untreated. He served as dean of the school from 1948 to 1958 and helped develop the University's total medical science program.

On June 29, 2018, the university's board of trustees unanimously voted to remove Parran's name from the building over the controversy of Parran's role in the Tuskegee and Guatemala syphilis experiments which occurred while he served as U.S. Surgeon General. The structure is now known simply as the Public Health Building.

== "Man" ==
The bronze and steel sculpture hanging high atop Parran Hall's facade, "Man" by Virgil Cantini, symbolizes the human quest for knowledge, with special reference to international research in the health fields. The dynamic composition shows an outstretched, skeletal figure in bronze surrounded by upward-moving, randomly placed peaks of varying sizes. Close-set circular steel bands unify the piece. The peaks represent the elevation of humanity above the mundane or peaks of progress. The circle represents universality. Originally lighted in front to dramatize the features of the sculpture, the lighting was removed when students began climbing the light and redirecting its rays into Cathedral of Learning classrooms or residence hall rooms.

== Crabtree Hall ==
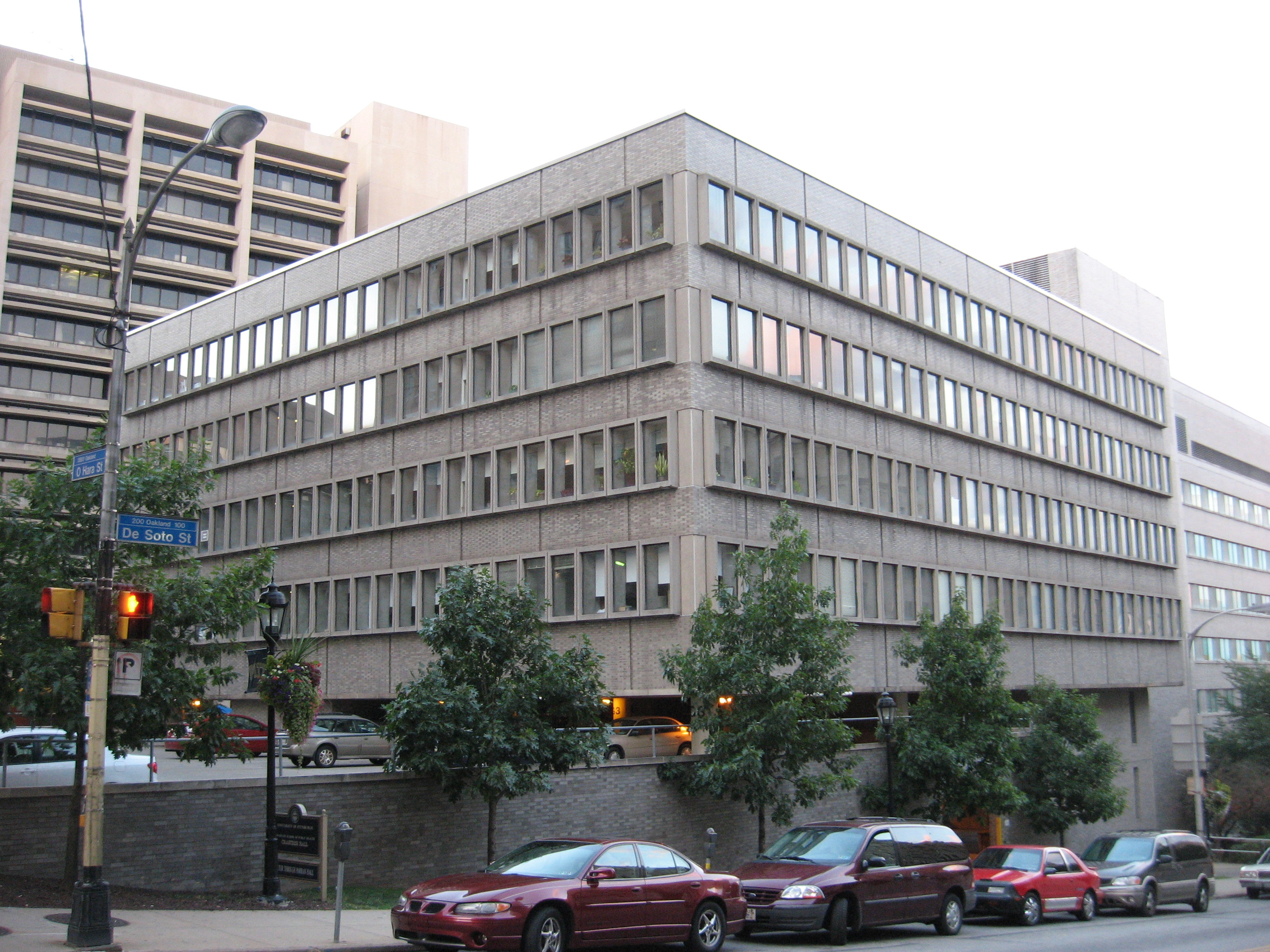
Crabtree Hall

Crabtree Hall is an annex to the north end of the Pitt's Public Health Building, adjacent to O'Hara Street. It was designed by the architectural firm of Deeter, Ritchey, and Sippel and completed in 1969 and dedicated to James A. Crabtree, head of the school's then Department of Public Health Practice and later its dean from 1958 until 1966.

== Addition ==
A major addition, renovation and infrastructure upgrade for the facilities housing Pitt Public Health was designed in 2010. A 57,000-square-foot (5,300 m^{2}), five-story addition was built in the location of the original auditorium of Parran Hall in order to expand the research facilities of the Graduate School of Public Health.

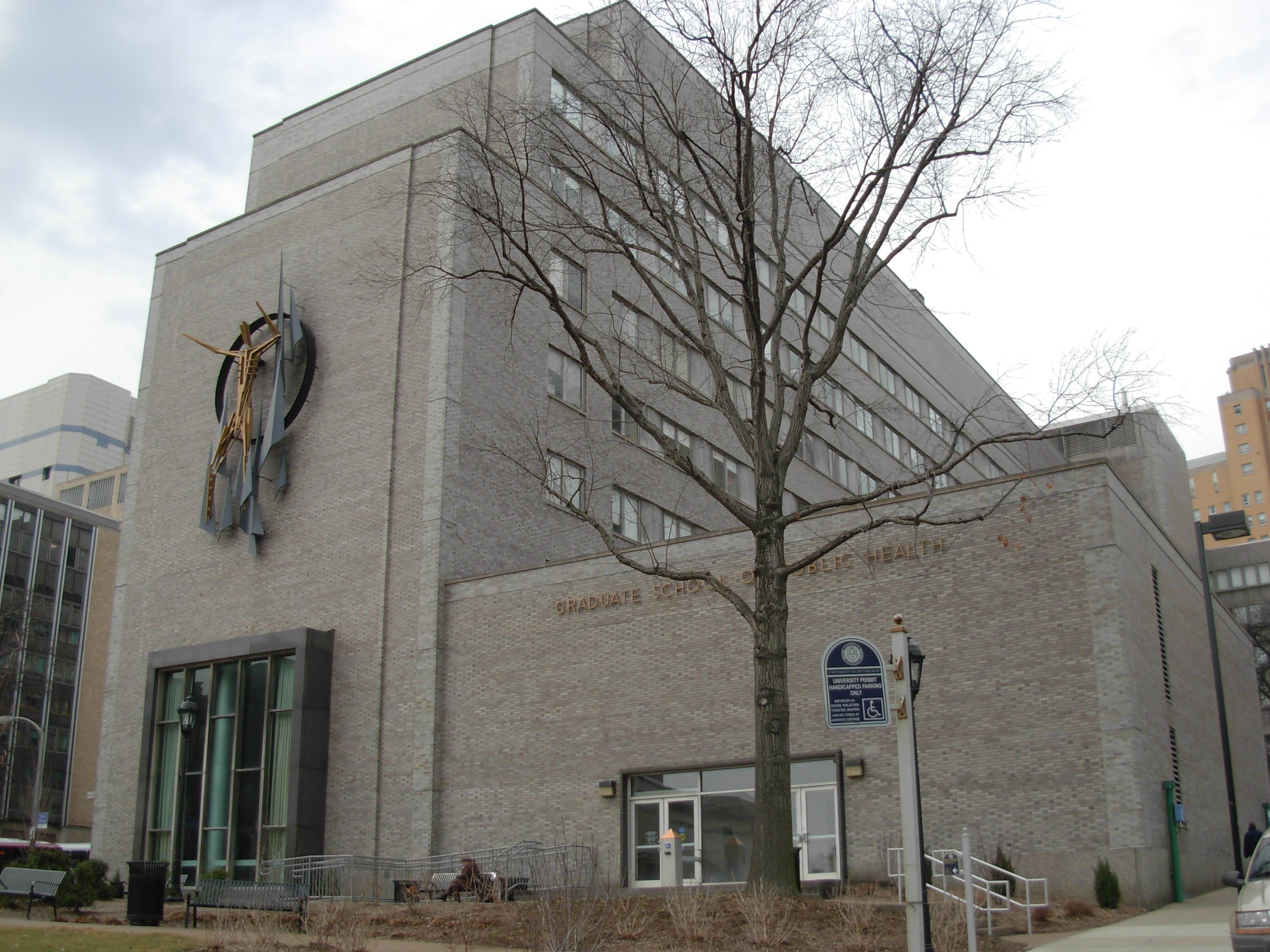
Parran Hall prior to the 2013 addition

Demolition began in summer 2011 for $32 million project, which was designed by Renaissance 3 Architects and Wilson Architects. New steel began to go up over the winter of 2012 for the lab pavilion addition where the G23 auditorium was located. Completed in 2013, the pavilion added research labs, a 215-seat auditorium, centralized freezer storage, and lounge/kitchen space on each floor while tying into the existing structure at ground floor and on the second through fourth floors.

A second phase of renovations involved wall-to-wall interior demolition of the 60-year-old former Parran Hall, followed by the reconstruction and modernization of all interior spaces. The project was completed in January, 2018, updating approximately 13,000-square-foot (1,200 m^{2}) of the main public health building as well as portions of Crabtree Hall.

== Bibliography ==
- Alberts, Robert C. (1987). Pitt: The Story of the University of Pittsburgh 1787-1987. Pittsburgh: University of Pittsburgh Press. ISBN 0-8229-1150-7.

| Preceded by Clapp Hall | University of Pittsburgh Buildings former Parran Hall; Constructed: 1957 | Succeeded by Langley Hall |
