= Lichtenfeld =

Lichtenfeld is a German language habitational surname. Notable people with the name include:

- Gabriel Judah Lichtenfeld (1811–1887), Jewish-Polish maskilic mathematician, poet, and author
- Gerhard Lichtenfeld (1921–1978), German sculptor and academic teacher
- Herbert Lichtenfeld (1927–2001), German television writer
- Imi Lichtenfeld (1910–1998), Hungarian-born Israeli martial artist
