= Federal Correctional Complex, Terre Haute =

United States federal prison complex

Coordinates: 39.4126°N 87.4542°W

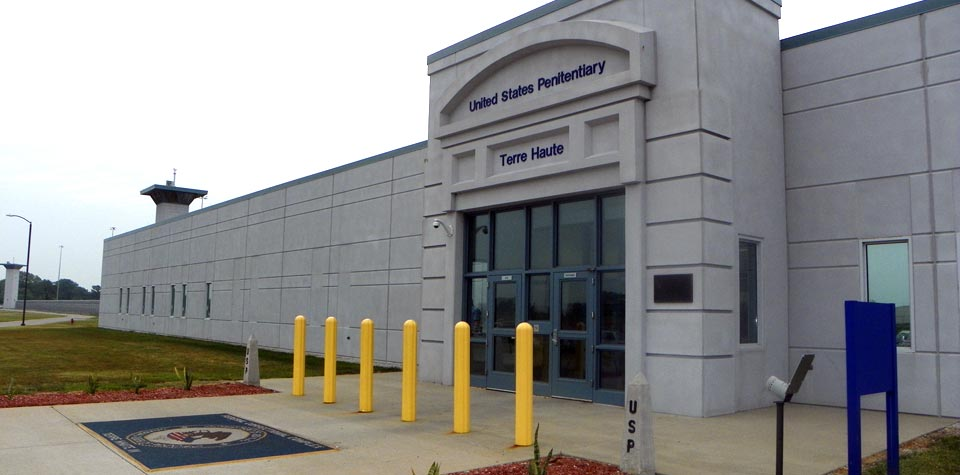
- United States Penitentiary, Terre Haute
- Interactive map of Federal Correctional Complex, Terre Haute
- Location: Terre Haute, Vigo County, Indiana
- Status: Operational
- Security class: High, medium, and minimum-security
- Population: 3,000 (two facilities and prison camp)
- Opened: 1940
- Managed by: Federal Bureau of Prisons

The Federal Correctional Complex, Terre Haute (FCC Terre Haute) is a United States federal prison complex for male inmates in Terre Haute, Indiana. It is operated by the Federal Bureau of Prisons, a division of the United States Department of Justice, and consists of two facilities:

- Federal Correctional Institution, Terre Haute (FCI Terre Haute): Established in 1940, it is a medium-security facility with a Communications Management Unit which holds inmates who are deemed to require increased monitoring of communications with others.
- United States Penitentiary, Terre Haute (USP Terre Haute): Established in 2005, it is a high-security facility which holds federal death row for men and also has a prison camp for minimum-security male offenders.

== Special Confinement Unit ==
United States Penitentiary, Terre Haute uses a Special Confinement Unit to separate federal male death sentenced inmates. Male inmates are transferred from other facilities, like state and federal prisons, for engagement in the Special Confinement Unit. USP Terre Haute opened the Special Confinement Unit on July, 13th 1999.

As of June 2026, two men, Dylann Roof and Robert Bowers, remain in the Special Confinement Unit.

== Segregated housing ==
Inmates considered high risk are immediately placed in a secure wing with more rules and supervision. These prisons are restricted segregation, which involves a twenty-three hour cell lock in, usually in solitary confinement. Inmates are allowed a thirty minute lunch and thirty minutes of yard time.

After Brian David Mitchell, the man who was convicted of the Elizabeth Smart kidnapping, was assaulted twice when inside of the segregated housing, which the staff chalked up to not responding to the incident quickly enough, along with a shortage of staff, the view of the prison's solitary confinement has been less favorable from those inside the prison.

== History ==
=== Gonorrhea experiments ===
The Terre Haute prison experiments in 1943 and 1944 were the precursor to the Syphilis experiments in Guatemala.

In 1942, the sixth Surgeon General of the United States, Thomas Parran, Jr., endorsed medical experiments on STD transmission so long as volunteers were found to be exposed to infection.

Because of the great prevalence of gonorrhea and its importance in the production of noneffective [sic] man-days both in the armed forces and civilian population, I believe that the human inoculation experiments proposed by Doctor Carpenter are justifiable if the human subjects are selected on a voluntary basis.

In 1943, a decision was made to use prisoners as volunteers, as soldiers could not be guaranteed sexual abstinence for six months, and the mentally ill were not considered appropriate research subjects. Due to legal issues, the Army Medical Corps preferred federal prisons to state run institutions, and Terre Haute had the best medical facilities. Prisoners participated with consent, receiving $100 for their involvement. A 2011 US Bioethics report states:

In total, 241 prisoners participated in the experiments, which ended in 1944. The first stage of the experiment required the investigators to develop a consistent technique for producing gonorrhea in subjects. Dr. Mahoney, Dr. Cutler, and their staff began efforts to infect subjects through artificial exposure in October 1943, a year after Dr. Carpenter first proposed the work to Dr. Moore. All subjects were inoculated with bacteria deposited into the end of the penis. The researchers tried a variety of strains and concentrations of gonorrhea. At least some of the strains were gathered from local commercial sex workers who were examined by Dr. Blum after they had been arrested in Terre Haute by local police.

The infection methods used by doctors did not involve natural sexual intercourse, unlike in 1947 in the Syphilis experiments in Guatemala. Dr. John Charles Cutler supported the experiment to his death.

=== Deaths ===
On September 15, 2010, prisoner Daniel L. Delaney (09416-112) murdered his cellmate while both were in the Special Housing Unit (SHU). Delaney was convicted of first degree murder for the act. He was transferred to ADX Florence.

=== Lawsuits ===
On January 12, 2023, Jurijus Kadamovas, a Soviet-born serial killer who had previously been housed in the facility, filed a class action complaint, claiming that the "severely isolating" conditions of the Special Housing Unit violated his human rights and were unconstitutional.

== See also ==
- List of U.S. federal prisons
- Incarceration in the United States
