= Juan María Funes =

Guatemalan physician, surgeon, and researcher (1907–1984)

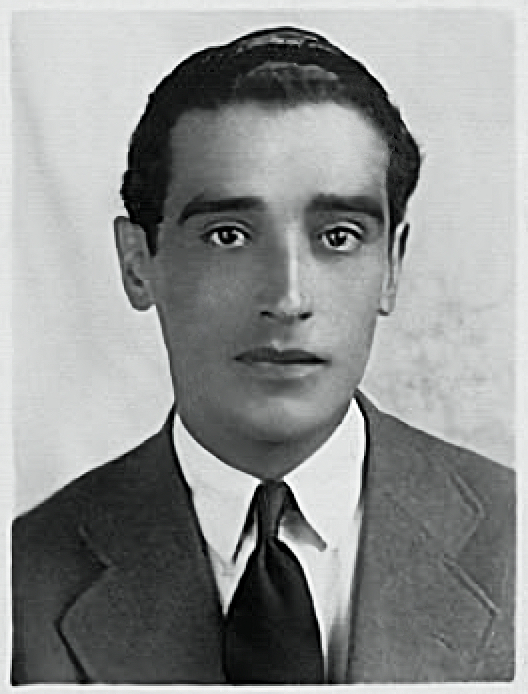
- Juan María Funes, circa 1939
- Born: Juan María Funes Fonseca; May 30, 1907; Guatemala City, Guatemala
- Died: August 23, 1984 (aged 77); Guatemala City, Guatemala
- Other names: Juan M. Funes, Juan Funes
- Education: Faculty of Medical Sciences of the National University of Guatemala (USAC)
- Occupations: Physician and surgeon
- Employers: • Ministry of Public Health and Social Assistance; • World Health Organization; • United States Public Health Service
- Known for: Human challenge studies
- Spouse: Matilde Luz Carrascosa
- Children: 4
- Parents: Juan María Funes; Concepción Fonseca

Juan María Funes (30 May 1907 - 23 August 1984) was a Guatemalan physician and surgeon who specialized in the diagnosis and treatment of sexually transmitted diseases (STDs). He studied at the Faculty of Medical Sciences of the National University of Guatemala, currently the University of San Carlos of Guatemala, and for his graduation thesis he conducted a study on female genital prolapse in the San Juan de Dios General Hospital. Within his specialty, he worked as a health administrator and researcher for the Ministry of Public Health and Social Assistance of Guatemala, the World Health Organization (WHO), and the United States Public Health Service (USPHS).

In 1945, while working at the Venereal Disease Research Laboratory in Staten Island, New York, he suggested to his American colleagues to conduct research on STDs in Guatemala, and subsequently he was one of the Guatemalan medical doctors involved in the experiments on sexually transmitted diseases performed in that country with human beings between 1946 and 1948, and directed by the American surgeon John Charles Cutler. Based on the results of these experiments, between 1949 and 1953 he published three articles in the Bulletin of the Pan-American Sanitary Bureau, currently the Pan-American Health Organization (PAHO), and in 1962 he co-founded the Guatemalan Academy of Dermatology, Syphilology and Leprology.

== Biography ==
Juan María Funes Fonseca was born in Guatemala City on May 29 or 30, 1907. He studied at the Faculty of Medical Sciences of the National University of Guatemala, currently the University of San Carlos of Guatemala, where he graduated in 1938 with a thesis titled Algunas consideraciones sobre la etiopatogenia y el tratamiento quirúrgico del prolapso genital, (Note: Some Considerations on the Etiopathogenesis and Surgical Treatment of Genital Prolapse.) in which he described the causes of uterine prolapse in Guatemalan women and the surgical treatments that were practiced in the 1930s, in the Gynaecology Service of the San Juan de Dios General Hospital, under the direction of the prominent physician Mario José Wunderlich. In the conclusions of his thesis, Funes indicated that uterine prolapse was quite frequent in Guatemala due to the anomalous conditions in which childbirth took place in rural areas of the country; that vaginal hysterectomy using the Charles Horace Mayo technique was the most effective surgical treatment for treating it in certain age groups; and, that the position of titular midwife should be established in Guatemala, at least in each departmental capital. (Note: Guatemala is territorially divided into departments, each with a capital city formally called cabecera departmental.)

During the government of Juan José Arévalo (1945–1951), Funes was the Head of the Venereology Section and Director of the Venereal Disease and Sexual Prophylaxis Hospital both divisions of the Ministry of Public Health and Social Assistance of Guatemala. Around 1950, he became Vice-Chairman of the World Health Organization's Syphilis Study Commission, and in 1954 he directed the National Anti-Venereal Campaign of Guatemala. From 1948 to 1956, he served as Special Consultant with the Venereal Disease Division, Bureau of State Services, USPHS, and in 1962, together with physicians Mariano Castillo and Rodrigo Sánchez, he founded the Guatemalan Academy of Dermatology, Syphilology and Leprology, currently the Guatemalan Academy of Dermatology.

Juan María Funes died in Guatemala City on August 23, 1984, at the age of 77.

== Involvement in STD experiments conducted in Guatemala ==
=== Background ===
In 1938, the surgeon general of the United States and operational head of the Public Health Service, Thomas Parran, declared before the U.S. Congress his support for increased funding and scientific research for public health, and the investment of personnel and resources to conduct specific research to develop more effective methods of prevention, treatment and control of sexually transmitted diseases than those available at the time, since the available methods were more than 30 years old, their effectiveness was uneven and their application cumbersome.

When World War II began in 1939, U.S. scientists, physicians and public health officials determined that there was an urgent need to develop better treatments to cure the STDs that would affect in troops during wartime, and expected up to 350,000 new gonorrhea infections per year, which would cause 7 million man-days lost, or the equivalent of losing the total strength of a year's worth of two military divisions or ten aircraft carriers, with a treatment cost of USD34 million, which is approximately USD770 million in 2024. That is, STDs were not only a public health problem in the United States, but also a threat to its national defense. Therefore, the Franklin D. Roosevelt administration, through the Committee on Medical Research of the Office of Scientific Research and Development, quickly allocated federal funds to mitigate that threat, giving medical specialists an unprecedented opportunity to conduct research aimed at reducing the harm caused by STDs to the armed forces and the general U.S. population.

In that context, Dr. Joseph Moore, head of the Subcommittee on Venereal Diseases of the U.S. National Research Committee and head of the Division of Venereal Diseases at Johns Hopkins University, approved the conduct of experimental research with volunteer, risk-informed human subjects, with the ultimate objective of finding a more effective prophylaxis to treat STDs. Although the problem of ethical and legal authorization of intentional exposure of human beings to such diseases remained unresolved, the research was conducted between 1943 and 1944 at the Terre Haute Penitentiary in Indiana. It was directed by the head of the Venereal Disease Research Laboratory, Dr. John F. Mahoney, from its headquarters in Staten Island, New York, and carried out at the penitentiary by Dr. John Cutler and Dr. Henrik Blum along with their technical staff. However, ten months after its inception, the research would be terminated in July 1944 by Mahoney's order because the researchers failed to induce, through artificial inoculation, a gonorrhea infection in the volunteers with the regularity necessary for the experimental methodical application of prophylactic agents. Subsequently, Drs. Mahoney, Cutler and others published the results of the experiments in January 1946, at about the same time that plans for research in Guatemala were being developed.

=== Experimental research carried out between 1946 and 1948 ===
In his writings, Cutler indicated that the idea of conducting research in Guatemala was proposed by Dr. Juan Funes in 1945, when he was working at the Venereal Disease Research Laboratory in Staten Island, New York, on a fellowship from the U.S. Office of Inter-American Affairs. According to Cutler, Dr. Funes had pointed out to him and other American colleagues that prostitution was legal in Guatemala, and that sex workers were required to undergo regular health inspections at the Sexual Prophylaxis Dispensary, which was attached to the Venereal Diseases Hospital (Note: Sex workers were given laboratory tests at the dispensary (clinic), and if the results indicated an STD infection, the affected woman was admitted to the hospital for treatment.) located in Guatemala City and directed by him, which was a circumstance that Cutler believed offered an excellent opportunity to conduct experimental STD research with human subjects.

Once Funes' idea attracted the attention of Dr. Mahoney and other U.S. medical authorities, it became a formal research project with a design similar to that of the Terre Haute research. It would be carried out with funds from the Venereal Disease Research Laboratory transferred to the Pan American Sanitary Bureau, (Note: Current Pan-American Health Organization (PAHO).) which would be implemented in Guatemala by Cutler and his team, with whom Funes would collaborate as a researcher and liaison with Guatemalan medical authorities, such as Dr. Luis Galich, who by then was the head of the General Directorate of Public Health. (Note: In the 1940s, the Ministry of Public Health and Social Assistance of Guatemala was administratively divided into the General Directorates of Social Assistance, Anti-Tuberculosis Fight, and Public Health.)

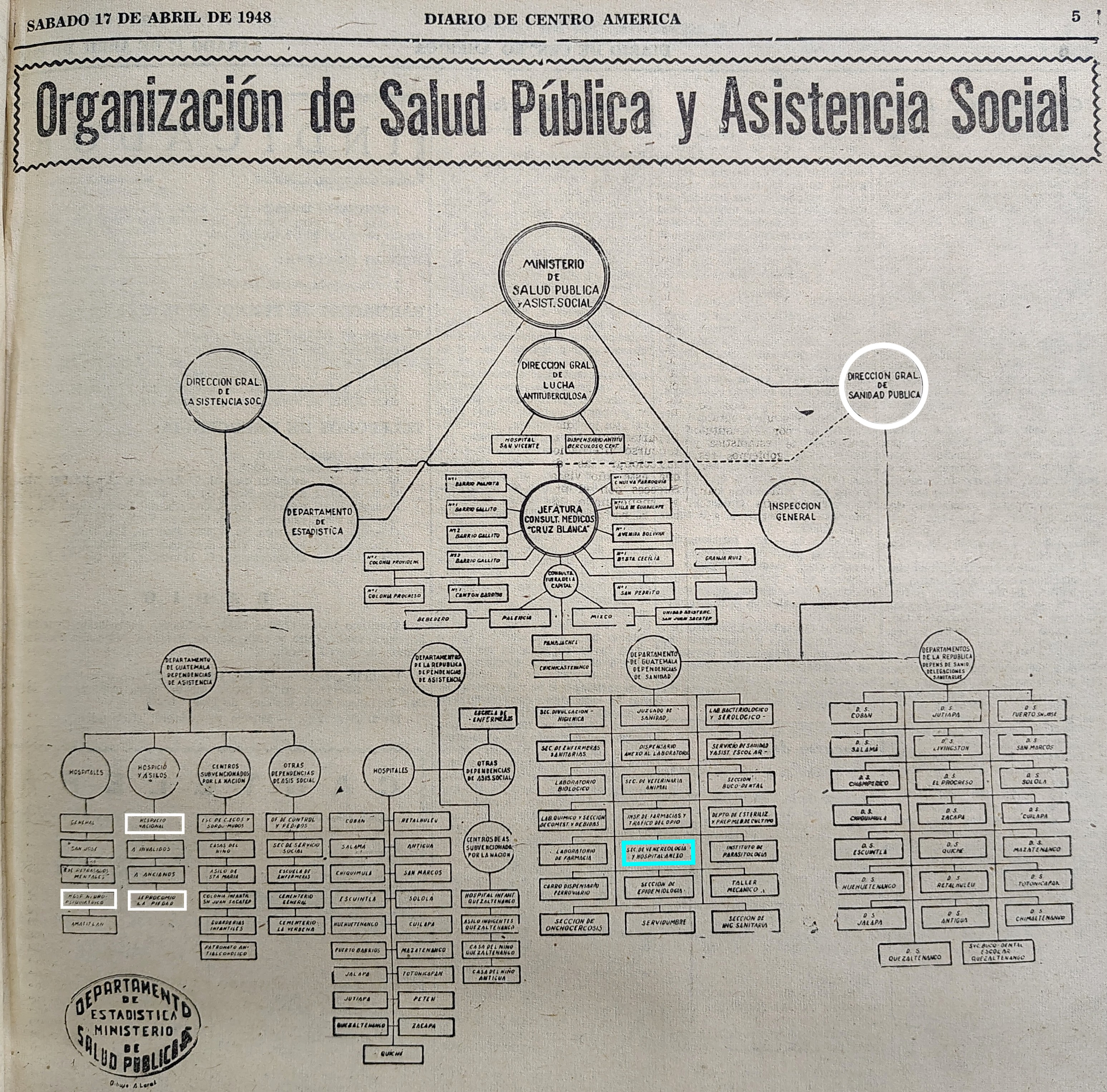
Organizational chart of the Ministry of Public Health of Guatemala of 1948. In cyan is highlighted the Venereology Section and Venereal Diseases Hospital, both directed by Dr. Funes. In white are highlighted the General Directorate of Public Health and the three places from which the researchers took human subjects for the serology study.

In August 1946, the Venereal Diseases Training and Research Center, created through a cooperation agreement between the General Directorate of Public Health of Guatemala and the Pan American Sanitary Bureau, began operating in Guatemala City. It would function specifically as a serology training and research center, and also as a center for the research of bacterial pathogens that cause STDs. Later that year, the research would begin in November 1946, it would consist of a serology study and a series of experiments with human subjects, and would end two years later, in December 1948.

The serology study was conducted with the main objective of improving methods of diagnosis of syphilis in Guatemala by testing the effectiveness of specific blood tests, and detecting antibodies to that disease in different human groups in the country. For their part, the experiments consisted of controlled inoculation of adult humans with syphilis, gonorrhea and chancroid to methodically produce artificially and sexually induced infections on a regular basis, so that researchers could carefully observe both the development of such diseases in the human body and the effect that the proven drugs, such as sulfathiazole and argyrol, had on them, in conjunction with penicillin, which was the most advanced treatment of the time, and whose effectiveness and methods of application were being tested and developed. All of this was done with the same ultimate objective as the Terre Haute research, which was to find a more effective prophylaxis to treat STDs.

The serology study included in Guatemala City, soldiers of Brigada Guardia de Honor (Honor Guard Brigade), inmates of Penitenciaría Central (Central Penitentiary), patients of the Hospital Neuropsiquiátrico (Neuropsychiatric Hospital), (Note: Directed by Dr. Carlos Salvado and part of the Directorate of Social Assistance. Dr. Salvado suggested to John Cutler the use of psychiatric patients for the experiments, and also made the hospital facilities and staff available to the researchers (PCSBI, 2011, p. 58).) children of Hospicio Nacional (National Hospice), and patients of Leprocomio La Piedad (La Piedad Leprosy Hospital). It also included public school children of Puerto de San José (San José Port) on the south coast of Guatemala, and personnel of the U.S. Air Force stationed in the same locality. (Note: These men were used as a control group, to find out if the results of the serology performed on the Guatemalans were the same as those obtained from Americans living in Guatemala (PCSBI, 2011, pp. 37, 177).) The STD experiments included soldiers, prisoners, psychiatric patients and sex workers, exclusively Guatemalan, and the artificial methods with which they were inoculated included the injection of pathogens directly into different parts of the body, and the manual application of infected exudates directly into the urethra and cervix, and into superficial wounds caused by abrasion or scarification of the skin. Sexual inoculation (Note: This method of inoculation was called "normal exposure" by the researchers (PCSBI, 2011, pp. 28, 29, 45, 54, 55).) was done through intercourse between men and sick sex workers, some as a result of their work, and others artificially inoculated previously by the researchers themselves.

Dr. Juan María Funes participated in both the serology study and the human subjects experiments for their duration and subsequent follow-up study on a paid basis. (Note: Dr. Juan Funes received a monthly payment of USD125 during the research (CPEEPHG, 2011, p. 84), which was about USD2000 in 2024.) His performance was so satisfactory, that Mahoney declared in a letter to Cutler his support to make Funes the leading syphilologist in Central America, which potentially offered him very good opportunities for professional development. During the research, Dr. Funes applied the knowledge he learned in the United States and was able to experiment scientifically with human beings, who were poor, illiterate and from marginalized communities, without development opportunities and vulnerable to abuse, who, moreover, did not receive any humanitarian benefit proportional to the harm inflicted on them, which, in some cases, was deliberately and severely intensified.

Likewise, Funes freely exercised his administrative authority to support the research, since in addition to using the facilities of the Venereal Diseases Hospital to carry out the inoculation experiments with artificial methods, he also procured the prostitutes to carry out the sexually induced inoculation experiments, and then sent them to Cutler to infect the soldiers and inmates with STDs. (Note: Dr. Luis Galich, head of the General Directorate of Public Health, also procured sex workers to conduct the study (PCSBI, 2011, p. 45).) This was very convenient for the study, since as the researchers discovered and contrary to their expectations, it was very difficult to find prostitutes willing to work under experimental conditions.

There is no evidence that these women gave written consent, that they knew the purpose of the experiments, and that they understood the health risks to which they would be subjected, although there is evidence that some were paid for their services. There is also no evidence that the soldiers, inmates, and psychiatric patients involved in the research voluntarily participated in the experiments or that they knew and understood their objectives and risks, and the rewards, when there were any, were cigarettes, bath soap, and a certain amount of money. Also, for the purpose of observing the evolution of the disease within a control group, they did not all receive treatments to cure the STDs they had been inoculated with, and instead and without being informed, they received a placebo. (Note: The placebo used in the experiments was an injection of 0.1 or 0.5 cc of sterile, distilled water (PCSBI, 2011, pp. 70, 183).) Others were inoculated several times when they were still sick to observe, for example, if in that condition they could be reinfected with a different strain of the same pathogen; or when they were already cured, to observe if a reinfection could occur after treatment and clinical course.

Such research could not be carried out in the United States, because it went beyond the ethical limits that the scientific community already publicly recognized in that country after World War II, (Note: To a large extent, the human experiments at Terre Haute were justified as a necessary effort to win the war (PCSBI, 2011, pp. 13-19, 21, 22), as there was a pressing need to develop a more effective prophylaxis to cure American soldiers suffering from STDs. Once the conflict was over, they became unnecessary, and without a pressing need, unethical.) which were also known by the authorities and researchers involved in the experiments conducted in Guatemala. This explains the high secrecy and confidentiality that was observed during its realization and in later years, as it would have caused enough controversy to cancel the research immediately and discredit the researchers involved. It is worth mentioning that, in addition to the collaboration of the authorities and physicians of the local public health system, both the support for the provision of medical services and the development of public health services, already provided by the United States prior to the research, may have influenced the decision to conduct it in Guatemala.

The end of the research began when Thomas Parran resigned as U.S. Surgeon General in February 1948, which meant the loss of a key supporter for continuing the work in Guatemala, so Dr. Mahoney instructed John Cutler to quickly move to an innocuous phase in the study, as he was apparently unsure of the new Surgeon General's stance on the experiments. For his part, Cutler focused on ensuring that the research was completed in a gradual and orderly manner, with sufficient time and money to complete the experiments and with resources for a follow-up study. Funds ran out in June 1948, but with the support of the Pan American Sanitary Bureau, they were extended until December, so experiments continued until October 1948. Meanwhile, Cutler urged Mahoney to seek a new grant in case the one they were using ran out before the research was completed, but Mahoney refused to do so, arguing that applying for it would require submitting a detailed report on the research, and as an alternative he instructed Cutler to distribute the remaining funds available, to carry out the follow-up study and, thanks to this, the laboratory that was established in 1946 continued to operate.

=== Follow-up study conducted between 1948 and 1953 ===
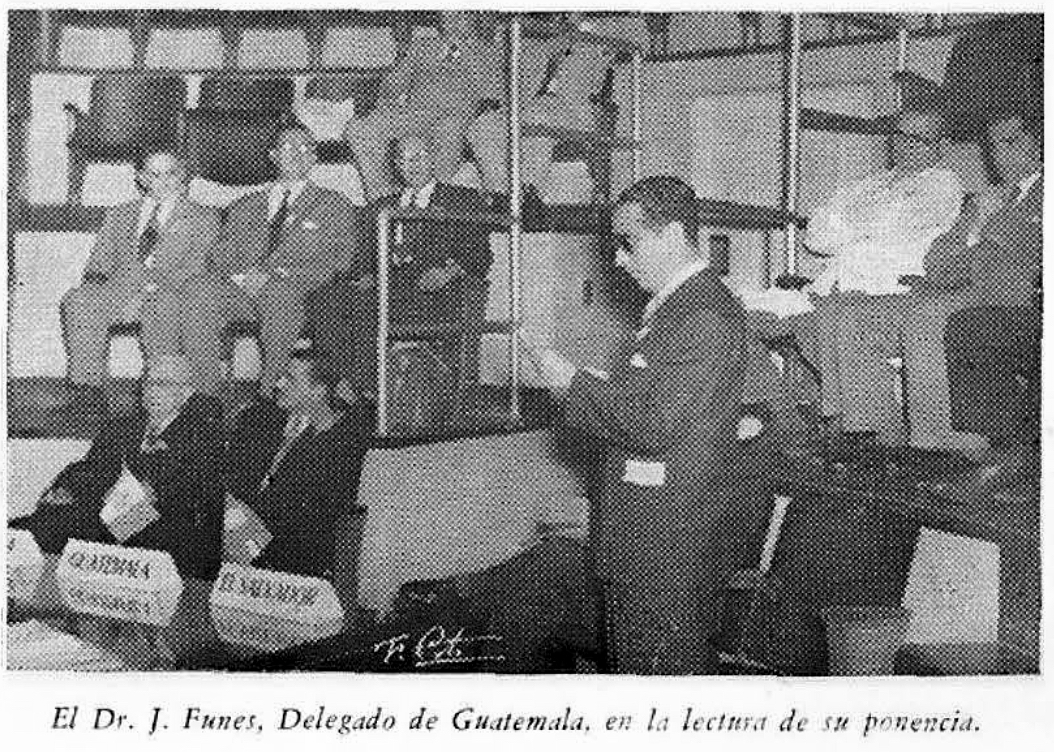
“Dr. J. Funes, Delegate of Guatemala, during the reading of his paper.” Juan Funes, presenting the results of his study on prophylaxis with the orvus-mapharsen solution, at the Fourth Central American Congress of Venereology, held in Costa Rica in 1952.

After John Cutler left Guatemala in December 1948, Dr. Juan Funes followed-up with the human subjects involved in both the serology study and the STD inoculation experiments, with the objective of collecting data from the children of the National Hospice, the inmates of the Central Penitentiary, and the patients of the Neuropsychiatric Hospital. (Note: Dr. Carlos Salvado was also hired on a paid basis for the follow-up study (PCSBI, 2011, pp. 35, 36, 82, 83, 114, 195).) Among Funes' specific duties were performing clinical examinations of treated patients and re-treatment as needed, collecting blood samples for serological testing at periodic intervals, preparing and shipping all collected blood samples for serological testing in the United States, and reporting accordingly. Dr. Funes followed-up with the children of the National Hospice until 1949, and the patients of the Neuropsychiatric Hospital until 1953. In parallel, in 1948, Funes studied the effectiveness of prophylaxis with orvus-mapharsen solution (Note: Named after the trade name of its constituent substances, this aqueous solution combined alkaryl sulfate (orvus) and oxophenarsin hydrochloride (mapharsen) to preventively treat syphilis and gonorrhea, when applied as a vaginal douche and topical antiseptic after sexual intercourse. The solution that Dr. Funes used in the study was made with a powdered mixture of 0.2% orvus and 0.02% mapharsen, dissolved in 500 cc of water, which was prepared and applied by the sex worker (Funes and Aguilar, 1952, p. 124).) for six months, in a voluntary group of six sex workers, with positive results, which he presented later at the Fourth Central American Congress of Venereology, held in Costa Rica in 1952.

Dr. Funes published, as lead author and co-author, three articles on the research in Guatemala in Boletín de la Oficina Sanitaria Panamericana. (Note: Bulletin of the Pan American Sanitary Bureau.) Although he never directly published data on the Guatemala syphilis experiments, he made a reference to them in his 1949 article:

The activities of the Training and Research Center resulted in the implantation of Neisseria gonorrhae cultures and this service made it possible to initiate and carry out research on the characteristics of infections with this germ among us and to make interesting deductions on their prophylaxis.

In the years following the research, Dr. Juan Funes continued to hold his positions in the Guatemalan public health system. Around 1950, he became the vice president of the World Health Organization's Syphilis Study Commission, and in 1954 he directed the National Anti-Venereal Campaign of Guatemala. From 1948 to 1956, he was a special consultant with the Venereal Disease Division of the U.S. Public Health Service, and in 1962 he co-founded the Guatemalan Academy of Dermatology, Syphilology and Leprology.

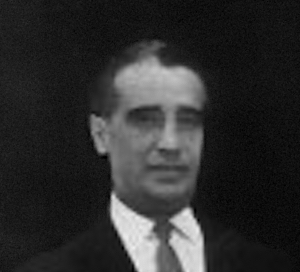
Juan María Funes, circa 1956.

== See also ==
- Guatemala syphilis experiments
- John Charles Cutler
- La Follette–Bulwinkle Act
- List of medical ethics cases
- Susan Mokotoff Reverby
- Tuskegee Syphilis Study
