= United States Public Health Service Syphilis Studies =

United States Public Health Service Syphilis Studies can refer to these human experiments of syphilis run by the United States Public Health Service:

- Guatemala syphilis experiments, by US doctors in Guatemala
- Terre Haute prison experiments, on prisoners in Terre Haute, Indiana, US
- Tuskegee Syphilis Study, Tuskegee University, Alabama, US
