= American Plan =

American Plan may refer to:

- American Plan (carceral), a 1918 U.S. program to combat venereal diseases, implemented by the Chamberlain–Kahn Act
- American Plan (union negotiations), a 1920s plan for refusing to negotiate with trades unions
- The American Plan, a 2009 play by Richard Greenberg
- American Plan, a term used by Sydney Brenner for a model of how brain cells determine their neural functions
- American plan, a hotel rate that includes accommodations and three meals per day; or modified American plan, which includes breakfast and dinner but not lunch
