= David Rosner =

American historian (born 1947)

- Born: March 13, 1947
- Died: May 24, 2026 (aged 79)
- Education: City College of New York (BA); University of Massachusetts, Amherst (MPH); Harvard University (PhD)

David Rosner (March 13, 1947 - May 24, 2026) was the Ronald H. Lauterstein Professor of Sociomedical Sciences and professor of history in the Graduate School of Arts and Sciences at Columbia University. He was also co-director of the Center for the History and Ethics of Public Health at Columbia's Mailman School of Public Health. He was elected to the National Academy of Sciences' Institute of Medicine in 2010.

== Influential work ==
Rosner's work has been influential in a number of international legislative and legal decisions regarding industrial safety and health, health policy and race relations. The 2005 edition of his book, Deadly Dust, co-authored with Gerald Markowitz, was one of the major stimuli of a five-year, international study of mining and health standards through collaboration with the Agence National Francais, the French equivalent of the National Science Foundation.

This collaboration brings together experts from countries around the world to discuss the variety of historical factors that have shaped international policies regarding silicosis, a deadly lung disease affecting workers in a host of industries. In its earlier 1991 edition, this book led to the bringing together of over 600 public health, industry and governmental experts from the National Institute for Occupational Safety and Health, the Occupational Safety and Health Administration, the Mining Safety and Health Administration and elsewhere in a National Conference on Silicosis in Washington. This conference led the Robert Reich, the US Secretary of Labor, to identify silicosis as a disease that should be eliminated in the coming years and the banning of certain dangerous practices in a variety of industries.

In addition, he had been a consultant and expert witness in lead poisoning cases, on behalf of the State of Rhode Island in its landmark suit against the lead pigment industry and individual plaintiffs injured by lead from paint on the walls of the nation's housing. Later again he also appeared in the California lead paint trial.

With Gerald Markowitz, Distinguished Professor of History at the City University of New York, and support from the National Science Foundation, he authored the book: Lead Wars: The Politics of Science and the Fate of America's Children, (Berkeley: University of California Press/Milbank Fund, 2013) which includes tracing the implications of lowered blood lead levels on public health research and practice.

=== Toxic Docs ===
Toxic Docs which reveals documents which support the story of the ongoing effort of the Lead Industries Association, the Tobacco industry and other propaganda organizations of industry to discredit public health concerns so they can continue to pollute and profit from dangerous products was also produced with Markowitz and also Merlin Chowkwanyun. Toxic Docs originated when Merlin Chowkwanyun assisted Rosner with creating a response to a criticism of two chapters in book Deceit and Denial: The Deadly Politics of Industrial Pollution by publishing the chapters online along with the original source documents as citations and later expanded that technique into Toxic Docs.

== Published works ==
Rosner was the author and editor of ten books; including A Once Charitable Enterprise (Cambridge University Press, 1982, 2004; Princeton University Press, 1987), Hives of Sickness:' Epidemics and Public Health in New York City (Rutgers University Press, 1995), and Health Care in America: Essays in Social History (with Susan Mokotoff Reverby).

In addition, he had co-authored and edited with Gerald Markowitz numerous books and articles, including Deadly Dust: Silicosis and the Politics of Occupational Disease in Twentieth Century America, (Princeton University Press, 1991;1994; University of Michigan, 2005), Children, Race, and Power: Kenneth and Mamie Clarks’ Northside Center, (University Press of Virginia, 1996; Routledge Press, 2001); Dying for Work, (Indiana University Press, 1987) and “Slaves of the Depression,” Workers’ Letters About Life on the Job, (Cornell University Press, 1987). Along with James Colgrove and Gerald Markowitz he co-edited The Contested Boundaries of Public Health which appeared from Rutgers University Press in 2008. He and Gerald Markowitz have authored Deceit and Denial: The Deadly Politics of Industrial Pollution (University of California Press/Milbank Fund, 2002) and Are We Ready? Public Health Since 9/11 (University of California Press/ Milbank, 2006). His book Lead Wars: The Politics of Science and the Fate of America's Children appeared in 2013 from the University of California Press/Milbank Fund.

Rosner served on the editorial board of the Journal of Public Health Policy, the Journal of Scientific Practice and Integrity, and Environmental Justice. He had also been an advisory editor for the University of Rochester's Press Series focusing on the study of medical history.

== Personal life ==
Dr. David Rosner received his BA from City College of New York in 1968, an MPH from the University of Massachusetts in 1972, and a PhD from Harvard University in 1978. The father of Zachary and Molly, he lived with his wife Dr. Kathlyn Conway, a psychotherapist and author, in New York City.

He was a member of the International Silicosis Project, a project organized through the French government and Sciences Po on the international comparison of an occupational disease, silicosis. In 2008, he was a fellow at the Ecole des Hautes Etudes en Sciences Sociales. In the past, he had participated in an IREX program on Eastern Europe.

== Honors ==
In addition to numerous grants, he has been a Guggenheim Fellow, a recipient of a Robert Wood Johnson Investigator Award, a National Endowment for the Humanities Fellow and a Josiah Macy Fellow. He was elected to the National Academy of Medicine in 2010. He has been awarded the Distinguished Scholar's Prize from the City University, the Viseltear Prize for Outstanding Work in the History of Public Health from the APHA and the Distinguished Alumnus Award from the University of Massachusetts. He has also been honored at the Awards Dinner of the New York Committee on Occupational Safety and Health and he and Gerald Markowitz have been awarded the Upton Sinclair Memorial Lectureship “For Outstanding Occupational Health, Safety, and Environmental Journalism by the American Industrial Hygiene Association.”
