= Thomas Parran (surgeon general) =

Physician and U.S. Public Health Service officer (1892–1968)

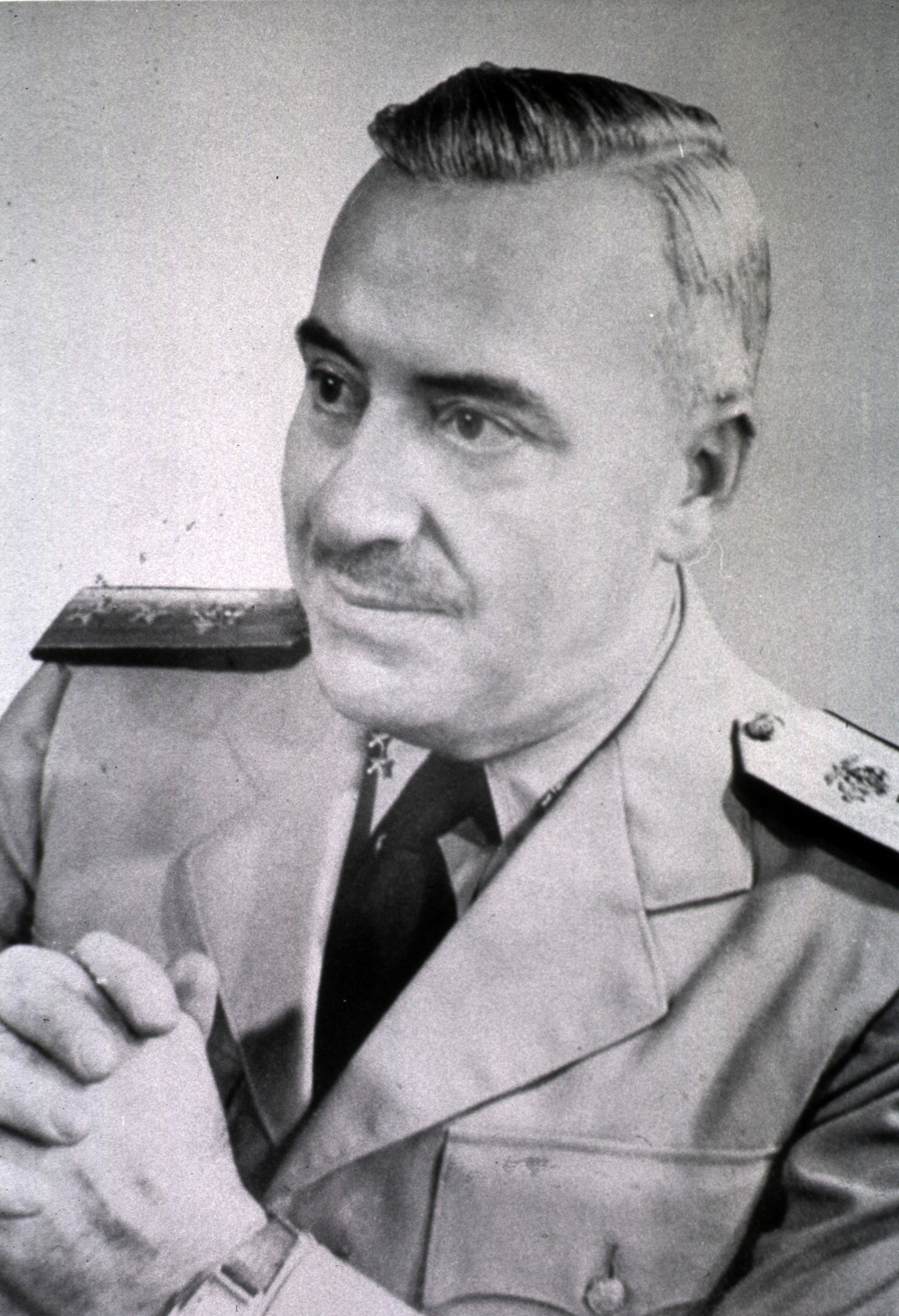

6th Surgeon General of the United States
- In office April 6, 1936 – April 6, 1948
- President: Franklin D. Roosevelt; Harry S. Truman
- Governor: Franklin D. Roosevelt; Herbert H. Lehman
- Preceded by: Hugh S. Cumming
- Succeeded by: Leonard A. Scheele

Commissioner of Health of the State of New York
- In office March 5, 1930 – May 6, 1936
- Preceded by: Matthias Nicoll Jr.
- Succeeded by: Edward S. Godfrey

Personal details
- Born: September 28, 1892 St. Leonard, Maryland, USA
- Died: February 16, 1968 (aged 75) Pittsburgh, Pennsylvania, USA
- Military service
- Allegiance: United States
- Branch: U.S. Public Health Service Commissioned Corps
- Service years: 1917–1948
- Rank: Vice Admiral

Thomas Parran (September 28, 1892 – February 16, 1968) was an American physician and Public Health Service officer. He was appointed the sixth Surgeon General of the United States from 1936 to 1948.

== Early life and education ==
Parran was born near St. Leonard, Maryland to Benjamin and Mary (Latimer) Parran on September 28, 1892. He was raised on his family's tobacco farm. He was tutored at home by a relative and attended St. John's College in Annapolis, Maryland, on a scholarship (1911, A.B.; 1915, A.M.). Finances influenced his decision to attend Georgetown University School of Medicine (1915, M.D.) and to follow with an internship at Sibley Memorial Hospital in Washington, D.C. A lifelong interest in research was sparked during medical school. He self-identified as Thomas Parran Jr. to distinguish himself from his uncle Thomas Parran, a Maryland politician and U.S. Representative in the Sixty-second Congress (who also had a son named Thomas Parran Jr.). Later in life Parran dropped the Jr. and named his first son Thomas Parran Jr.

== Early career ==
Parran volunteered at a health laboratory operated by the District of Columbia, under Joseph J. Kinyoun, founder of Public Health Service's Hygienic Laboratory (renamed the National Institute of Health in 1930). Kinyoun recruited Parran to join a field team of young physicians under PHS's Leslie L. Lumsden, building privies and surveying conditions in the Southern United States. In March 1917, Parran reported to Okmulgee, Oklahoma, for the first of many assignments in rural sanitation.

After receiving an Assistant Surgeon's commission in September 1917, Parran continued on assignments in rural health services administration, sanitation, and the control of communicable diseases; between field assignments, Parran tasted life as an administrator in Washington, DC. In October 1923, he joined a group of young medical officers who attended 6 months of coursework at the Hygienic Laboratory, receiving the practical equivalent of a master's degree in public health. Parran's first leadership position was as Chief of PHS's Division of Venereal Diseases (September 1926), a program begun during World War I. Parran worked to sway public sentiment away from moral condemnation of venereal diseases and toward consideration of syphilis as a medical condition and threat to public health.

His talents in rural health administration would soon lead him temporarily in a new direction. A reform-minded governor, Franklin Roosevelt, requested for Parran to be loaned to the State of New York, where in April 1930 Parran took up his post as state health commissioner. His primary task was chairing a Special Health Commission whose recommendations (1932) provided a framework to bolster county health departments in the face of needs in the Great Depression. Few of the commission's recommendations were enacted. Parran's work on syphilis achieved more success. The Columbia Broadcasting System inadvertently launched his campaign after radio executives censored the phrase "syphilis control" from a talk, leading Parran to cancel his appearance. Newspapers across the United States reprinted the censored speech.

== Surgeon General ==
Parran became active in New Deal politics in New York and entered national politics as well. In 1934, his former supervisor, now President of the United States, Roosevelt, appointed Parran to the Committee on Economic Security, which drafted the Social Security Act of 1935; Title VI authorized millions for public health departments and for biomedical research. After Surgeon General Hugh S. Cumming's term, President Roosevelt appointed Parran as Surgeon General of the United States; he was sworn in on 6 April 1936.

Parran's syphilis control campaign was in full swing by the fall of 1936. Title VI funds supported efforts to identify and treat syphilis, and the National Venereal Disease Control Act of 1938 made funds available for rapid treatment centers that employed the new sulfa drugs and, later, penicillin. During 1937 his book about syphilis, Shadow on the Land, was published and very well received. However, some scholars have argued that his work against syphilis is tainted by the Tuskegee Syphilis Study (1932–1972) and the Guatemala syphilis experiments (1946–1948), which were conducted by the PHS's Division of Venereal Diseases, partially during his tenure as Surgeon General.

During World War II, reports from Europe indicated that the public health situation was dire, prompt action was needed, and a highly qualified medical officer was required to direct the Public Health Division of the Civil Affairs Branch (G-5) of the newly formed headquarters. Because all of the senior Army medical officers with competence in this field were already holding highly important positions, the Army turned to Parran for help, and he released his deputy, Warren Fales Draper, to the military headquarters. Draper became a member of General Dwight Eisenhower's staff as the Chief of the Public Health Branch and the top public health adviser for Supreme Headquarters, American Expeditionary Forces with the rank of brigadier general.

In addition to syphilis control, Surgeon General Parran left his mark on the scope and structure of public health, both at home and abroad. World War II brought quick expansion and new opportunities for expanded duties. In response Parran and his deputies rewrote the statutes underlying PHS operations, the Public Health Service Acts of 1943 and 1944, establishing a four-bureau structure (consisting of the National Institute of Health, Bureau of State Services, Bureau of Medical Services, and Office of the Surgeon General) that would remain in place through 1967 deftly arranged for the transfer of wartime research contracts from the Office of Scientific Research and Development, creating an extramural grants program for NIH. Parran also served as a mentor to a generation of Public Health Service Commissioned Corps physicians, to whom he gave the leeway to create new institutions and programs in the areas of clinical research into cancer and other conditions, mental health, tuberculosis control, prevention of malaria and other communicable diseases, construction of nonprofit hospitals, and international health. Parran's leadership role in international health affairs dated back to the 1930s with the Rockefeller Foundation and the Pan American Health Organization. Parran chaired the International Health Conference where the World Health Organization (WHO) draft constitution was adopted (1946) and led subsequent U.S. delegations.

Parran was an early and committed advocate of national health insurance, shielding PHS from direct conflict with those who opposed insurance by tempering his public advocacy with a focus on creating a regionally-organized health services infrastructure to precede federal dollars for care. The Hospital Survey and Construction Act of 1946 (Hill–Burton Act) was a signal step in this direction. Nevertheless, Parran was attacked by American Medical Association editorialist Morris Fishbein for supporting President Truman's proposed national insurance program. Truman's decision not to reappoint Parran in the spring of 1948 may have been an outcome of public disputes over this issue. Parran declined the position of Director of the World Health Organization to attempt to maintain the independence of the Public Health Service from the newly created bureaucracy, the Department of Health Education and Welfare. He lost that fight and his job, only to move on again to further advances in the health education field.

== Later life ==
On 1 October 1948, Surgeon General Parran retired from PHS as Vice Admiral to begin a career in academic administration, to serve as the first dean of the new School of Public Health at the University of Pittsburgh. Parran made Pittsburgh, Pennsylvania a proving ground for ideas developed during his tenure at PHS, recruiting the school's first generation of senior faculty and bringing his deputy surgeon general and veteran international health administrator, James A. Crabtree, who succeeded him as dean in 1958. Beyond his tenure as Surgeon General, Parran remained prominent in international health, active in the Pan American Sanitary Organization and in Rockefeller Foundation programs. On retiring from Pittsburgh in 1958, Parran became president of the Avalon Foundation, affiliated with the Mellon family, and became active in the A. W. Mellon Educational and Charitable Trust, where he had served as a trustee since 1955. He continued his work in philanthropy and public health until his death in Pittsburgh, Pennsylvania. The home of the University of Pittsburgh's Graduate School of Public Health, Parran Hall, was renamed for Parran in 1969.

A collection of his papers is held at the National Library of Medicine in Bethesda, Maryland. Most of his papers concerning his tenure as Surgeon General and his work after are held at the University of Pittsburgh. He is buried at Arlington National Cemetery with his second wife Carol.

== Thomas Parran Award ==
The American Sexually Transmitted Diseases Association named its lifetime achievement award after Parran in recognition of his work to raise awareness of sexually transmitted diseases. However, his role in the early part of the Tuskegee study and in the Guatemala syphilis experiments prompted the association to consider renaming the award. In April, 2013, after some consultation with members, the Association executive renamed the Thomas Parran Award as 'The ASTDA Distinguished Career Award'.

== Involvement with unethical experimentation ==
In June 2018, the University of Pittsburgh announced that it would remove Parran's name from the campus building that houses the Graduate School of Public Health due to his involvement in the infamous Tuskegee Syphilis Study which has a legacy of unethical experimentation. The Tuskegee Syphilis Study took place from 1932-1972 and occurred during Parren's time as surgeon general from 1936-1948.The experiment began in 1932 under surgeon general Hugh S. Cumming. In total, 8 different surgeon general's held office while the experiment continued until 1972. Thomas Parren was in office the longest serving 12 years as surgeon general. It involved experimentation on African-American adults, children, and people with disabilities without their knowledge or consent. Information about the study and life-sustaining treatment was withheld from 399 Black men with syphilis so researchers could observe the progress of the disease. Over the course of the 40-year study, 28 men died from syphilis, 40 spouses were infected, and 19 children were born with a congenital form of the disease.

An official committee at the University of Pittsburgh reported the following on Parran, who was a founder of the University's Graduate School of Public Health: “Dr. Parran’s role, and the extent of his influence in approving, funding, and providing oversight of the Tuskegee and Guatemalan studies, is not entirely clear. Based upon the evidence available today, it might not be possible to determine with certainty Dr. Parran’s level of knowledge and involvement in the studies.”

In a 1947 letter to John Charles Cutler (the lead researcher of the Guatemala STD studies) Parran is quoted as having said "You know, we couldn’t do such an experiment in this country,” which would suggest he was aware of some of the ethical issues in the study.

== See also ==
- La Follette–Bulwinkle Act
