= World War II U.S. Military Sex Education =

Sex education program in the US military

The outbreaks of sexually transmitted infections in World War II brought interest in sex education to the public and the government. During the late 1930s and early 1940s, military maneuvers increased worldwide and sexual hygiene and conduct became major problems for the troops. Soldiers and sailors on assignment overseas were often lonely, had time to spare, got homesick, or were just looking for female companionship. This resulted in many men having multiple sex partners, and as a result, became a major health concern. During the Great War, venereal diseases (V.D.) had caused the United States Army to lose 18,000 servicemen per day. Although by 1944, this number had been reduced 30-fold, there were still around 606 servicemen incapacitated daily. This drop in numbers was partly because of the Army's effort to raise awareness about the dangers faced by servicemen through poor sexual hygiene, and also because of the important developments in medicine. In late 1943, a case of gonorrhea required a hospital treatment of 30 days, and curing syphilis remained a 6-month ordeal. By mid-1944, the average case of gonorrhea was reduced to 5 days, and in many cases the patient remained on duty while being treated.

== Education ==
Soldiers and sailors were taught to either abstain from sex or commit to a long-term mutually monogamous relationship with a partner who had tested negative for venereal disease. However, latex condoms were encouraged for every sexual encounter.

=== Posters ===
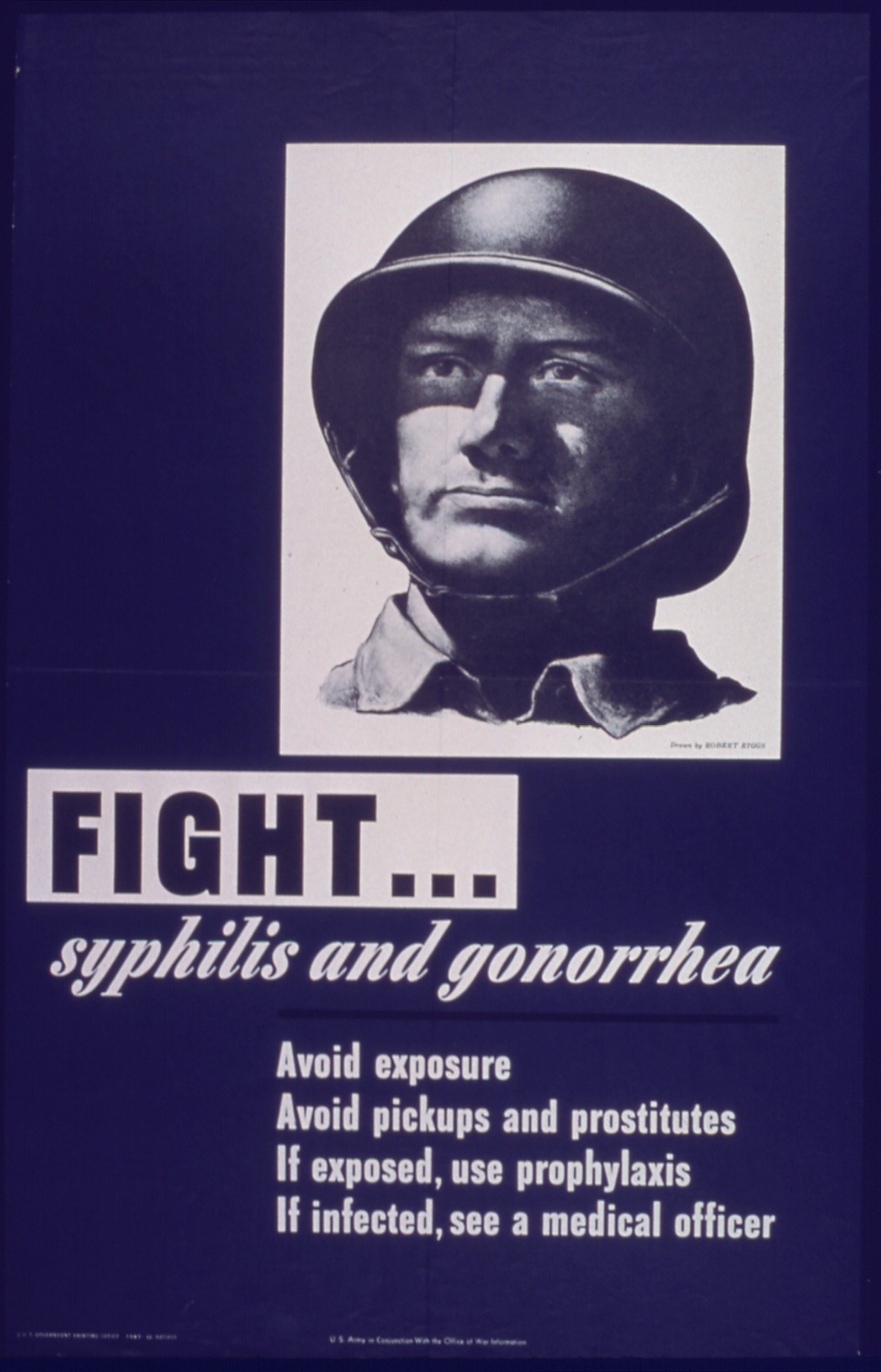

To raise awareness about practicing safe sex amongst its recruits, the U.S. Government produced a series of posters which were displayed in Army barracks, hospitals, and railway stations. Many of the posters were straightforward like the awareness posters of today. The Selective Service discovered that almost fifteen percent of those who were eligible for the draft were already infected with a venereal disease, sparking an intense anti-venereal disease campaign across America. Red-light districts were shut down, and American cities sought new laws which would criminalize prostitution to protect young men from contracting a venereal infection.

=== Pamphlets ===
The U.S. Government produced a number of pamphlets which were issued to troops educating them about the importance of good sexual health. One of these pamphlets was "Sex Hygiene and Venereal Disease", printed August 1, 1940 by the U.S. Government Printing Office. There were also 1942 and 1943 editions. The pamphlet was to be furnished to each recruit upon enlistment. The booklet not only offered information to soldiers about avoiding V.D., but also what to do if they became infected. The pamphlet provided sufficient information about various diseases to allow troops to diagnose diseases and infections without visiting the Pro-Station. The following is the summary which is offered by the pamphlet:

1. Manhood comes from healthy sex organs.
2. It is not necessary to have sexual intercourse in order to keep strong and well.
3. Disease may ruin the sex organs and deprive a man of his health and happiness.
4. You have a fine healthy body now. Keep it that way.
5. Venereal diseases come from sex relations or intimate contact with a diseased person. They are very serious. Gonorrhea and syphilis are two of the worst.
6. Most prostitutes have venereal disease.
7. Guard against venereal disease by staying away from "easy" women. Don't gamble your health away.
8. If you do not have self-control then do not fail to take safety measures.
9. If you get infected, report at once to your commanding officer. Time is most important.
10. Will power and self-control help to keep a man's body and mind healthy.
11. A healthy body and a healthy mind lead to happiness.

=== Training films ===
Sex Hygiene, US Army training film, directed by John Ford

By 1941, many of the sex education materials had been created by the Public Health Service. Hollywood produced motion picture films that showed men exactly how to play safe and what to do if they caught syphilis or gonorrhea. Later on these films were made available for wider distribution by the nation's various state and local health departments.

== Wet dreams and masturbation ==
In the 1940s, personnel were taught that a wet dream is when the sex gland fills up with sperm and overflows while a man is asleep. This may happen several times a month or only once or twice in several months. Many medical officers taught their personnel that a wet dream is normal for men and that they needed to take extra precautions against doctors that may try to mislead them into buying their fake cures.

During World War II, masturbation was defined as having the same effect on the body as a wet dream. "Although a childish habit, it does no real harm and does not lead to insanity. If you have this unfortunate habit, try to control it as a matter of pride."

== Venereal diseases ==
In World War II, venereal disease was a serious problem for the US Army and Navy. In some hospitals one out of eight men had contracted some form of venereal disease. Two of the worst venereal diseases known to the Medical Department during the Second World War were gonorrhea and syphilis. Consequently the majority of treatment and awareness programs had great emphasis on these two infections in particular.

Syphilis is a sexually transmitted infection (STI) that can cause long-term complications and/or death if not treated correctly. Symptoms in adults are divided into stages. These stages are primary, secondary, latent, and late syphilis. Syphilis has been called "the great imitator" because it has so many possible symptoms, many of which look like symptoms from other diseases. The painless syphilis sore that the soldier or sailor would get after they were first infected can be confused for an ingrown hair, zipper cut, or other seemingly harmless bump. The non-itchy body rash that develops during the second stage of syphilis can show up on the palms of the hands and soles of the feet, all over the body, or in just a few places. Men can be infected with syphilis and have very mild symptoms or none at all.

Also called the "clap" or "drip", gonorrhea is a contagious infection transmitted most often through sexual contact with an infected person. It can also be spread by contact with infected bodily fluids, so both men and women are susceptible. The infection spreads most often among people who have many sex partners.

During the war, medics were generally supplied with prophylactic kits in bulk, designed to allow a man to perform treatment on himself if he feared he had sex with an infected woman. The individual packet contained a tube containing 5 grams of ointment (30% calomel + 15% sulfathiazole), a direction sheet explaining how to apply the ointment, a soap impregnated cloth and cleansing tissue. Sometimes the men were issued condoms (usually three to a pack) and sometimes they were given Sulfonamide (sulfa drugs) or other pills to carry "just in case".

The U.S. Military highly encouraged the men to use condoms during sexual intercourse, concerned that servicemen would bring home diseases and infect their wives. Government training films urged soldiers, "Don't forget - put it on before you put it in."

== Prevalence of disease ==
The military struggled greatly with determining the true rates of venereal disease among the troops. According to the U.S. Army Medical Department's Office of Medical History, many soldiers already had V.D. before enlisting, but were counted as a new infection when they were treated by medical personnel, increasing the officially recorded rate of V.D. Additionally, some soldiers were transferred between hospitals during treatment, but were counted as a new infection when they arrived at the new hospital, further increasing the V.D. rate. The V.D. rate was artificially lowered by medical staff who treated patients without recording it. This was done mostly at the request of the troops, who feared punishment for contracting V.D. Throughout the war, officers had a noticeably lower recorded rate of V.D. The Army believes that this was because officers were able to get medical treatment from Army medical personnel, and then pressure them into not recording the incident.

Despite these issues, the Army concluded that the lowest rates of V.D. occurred in 1943, then rose throughout 1944 and 1945, and again increased markedly after the cessation of hostilities. Despite the raise in V.D. throughout the war, personnel noneffectiveness due to V.D. decreased, likely due to better treatment.

== Women's health ==
World War II also saw the creation of women's military corps. For the first time, women were able to serve their country, though not in a combat capacity, without serving as a nurse or laundress. In the Women's Army Corps, women were enlisted and commissioned as soldiers and officers in much the same way that the Army enlisted and commissioned men. Women serving in the Armed Forces, however, were absent from venereal disease poster artwork during the World War II era.

== Government input ==
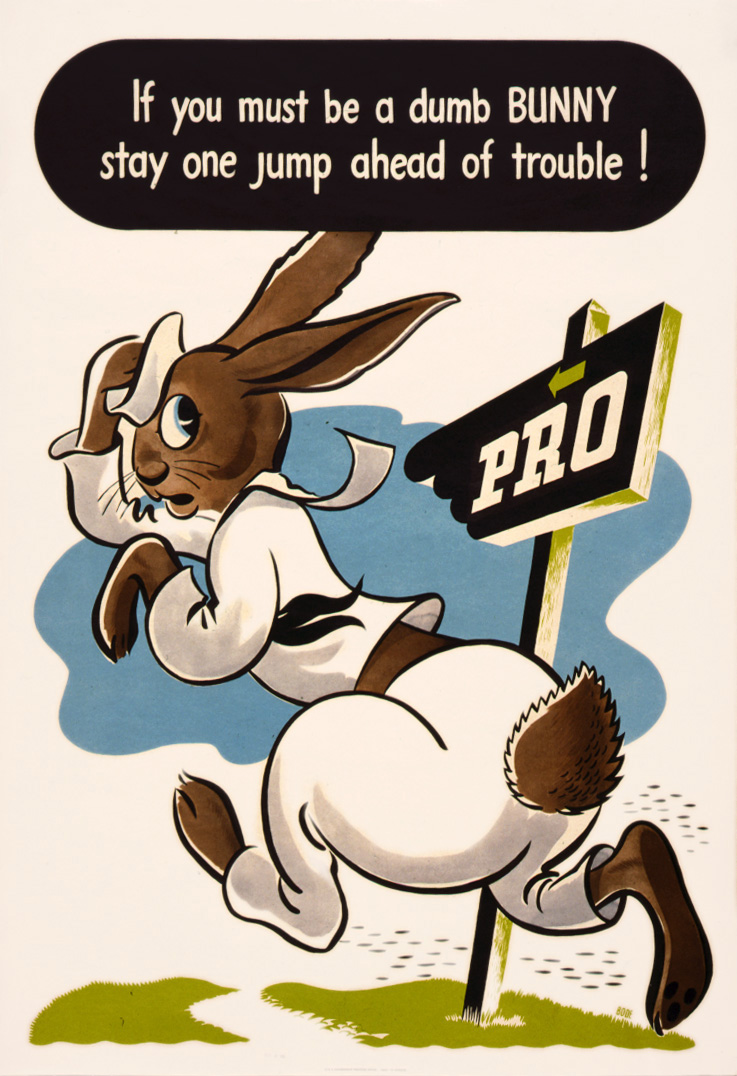
Rabbit, in sailor's suit, running in direction of sign pointing to ("pro"), 1945, 'U.S. Government Printing Office)

The first American Forces stationed in Northern Ireland (USANIF) and in the British Isles (USAFBI) received special attention from the Medical Department. The units were directed, in cooperation with local authorities, to establish the first off-base Prophylactic Stations and trace the contacts of servicemen who became infected. American units were warned to keep everything as tactful as possible, and to use general terms such as U.S. Army Aid Station, instead of Prophylactic Station. Despite the measures taken, V.D. spread among the troops, and even with rapid and effective treatment, including the use of sulfa drugs and penicillin, the cost to the Army was heavy due to lost time from duty, diversion of medical resources, and political and social tensions between American Forces and their British hosts.

This also occurred in France, after the liberation of Paris, and to some extent in Germany, although this country was by then militarily defeated and occupied. V.D. control officers were appointed and special recreation programs were introduced in close cooperation with the Red Cross and Special Services. Sexual education was emphasized and line officers, surgeons, and chaplains gave lectures.

== Laws ==
In 1940, the military, the Public Health Service, and the American Social Hygiene Association, a private organization, agreed to cooperate in creating a plan "to defend the armed and industrial forces from venereal disease". The May Act, which was passed in 1941, enables the Justice department to override local authorities and directly police areas that presented a threat to the safety of either military or industrial workers. The Lanham Act, which was also passed in 1941, specifically provided the funds for hospitals where carriers of venereal disease could be quarantined until they had been cured. The Comstock laws effectively made any form of contraception illegal in the United States, punishable as a misdemeanor with a six-month minimum prison sentence. Titled the Eight – Point Agreement, this plan called for an expansion of the service's existing campaign to control venereal diseases. This gave the Army, Navy, Public Health Service, and ASHA developed and implemented aggressive measures to track the spread of venereal disease, to encourage the infected to seek medical care, to provide treatment to those who were infected, to repress prostitution, and finally, to promote sex education to arrest the further spread of disease.

== Discrimination ==
=== Homosexuals ===
During World War II, as a product of psychiatry's increasing authority, the military chose to exclude homosexuals because of them being regarded as having a mental illness and because they believed homosexuals would hurt the productivity of the armed forces. The military used a screening process through military psychiatrists in determining if an individual was homosexual or not. Some psychiatrists did not enforce their screening and many soldiers lied to psychiatrists about their homosexuality so many were thus able to enroll into the armed forces regardless. Homosexuality was a crime according to the military and was punishable by prison. Because military prisons already held more than capacity, a new discharge system was used instead.

=== Lesbians ===
The formation of the Women's Army Corps provided a place for lesbian women within an otherwise wholly male institution. Rumors of difficult enrollment screenings for gay men deterred very few lesbians. Because of women's marginal status in the military before World War II, neither the Army nor the Navy had developed policies or procedures concerning lesbian enrollment in the armed services (p. 28). Even on the home front, criminal law generally ignored lesbians and women were rarely prosecuted in court for engaging in sex acts with other women. At the onset of the war, psychiatrists and military officers reflected this history of invisibility and issued no policies or procedures for screening out lesbians (p. 28). The pressure to meet unfilled personnel quotas was also a significant force in keeping recruiting officers and examiners from prying into the sexual lives of women volunteers (p. 29). During entrance exams, female masculinity, unlike male effeminacy, was not considered to be a disqualifying defect, reflecting the military's need for women who could perform traditional male jobs.

The Women's Army Corps represented a pivotal turn in cultural understandings around gender and sexuality. As the culture of the 1940s grew increasingly anxious about women's sexuality as a result of the shift in public or private spheres, and homosexuality in particular, the formation of the WAC sparked a storm of public speculation and concern of the potential breakdown of heterosexual norms and sexual morality. Historically, women had been most visibly associated with the military as prostitutes. The general public expressed fear that, in forming the WAC, the military was trying to create an organized coalition of prostitutes to service male GIs. Print media of the World War II era supported a dual effort to maintain a sense of "normalcy" through prescriptions of control and containment of women's sexuality, within and outside of the military, while simultaneously "normalizing" the drafting of women into the armed services. The media both responded to and reinforced emergent cultural and political perceptions of a threat to the existing social structure. The response of Women's Army Corps Director Colonel Oveta Culp Hobby was to challenge this by characterizing female soldiers as chaste and asexual (p. 66). Like advertising and other media elements, military propaganda emphasized traditional female qualities and roles. For example, a magazine article featuring the WAC declared, "You'll like this girl. She does a man's work...servicing airplanes, but she hasn't lost any of her feminine sweetness or charm" (p. 17).

=== African Americans ===
In segregated America, African Americans disproportionately lived in poverty. Compared with whites, the majority of African American military personnel had limited to no access to education opportunities, good wages, or health care, all factors that were crucial in protecting Americans from venereal disease and ensuring treatment for the infected. By the 1940s these problems had created a situation in which "sexually transmitted diseases were nationally known as special problems of the black people". As America continued to be segregated even though African, Asian, and Native American soldiers fought for democracy abroad, federal funds were desperately needed simply to ensure that sex education programs could reach those who needed them. Both immediately before and during the war, these federal funds transformed the battle against sexual ignorance and the problems caused by this ignorance throughout the United States, but especially in the South by ensuring that all races and classes received some form of sex education.

=== Women ===
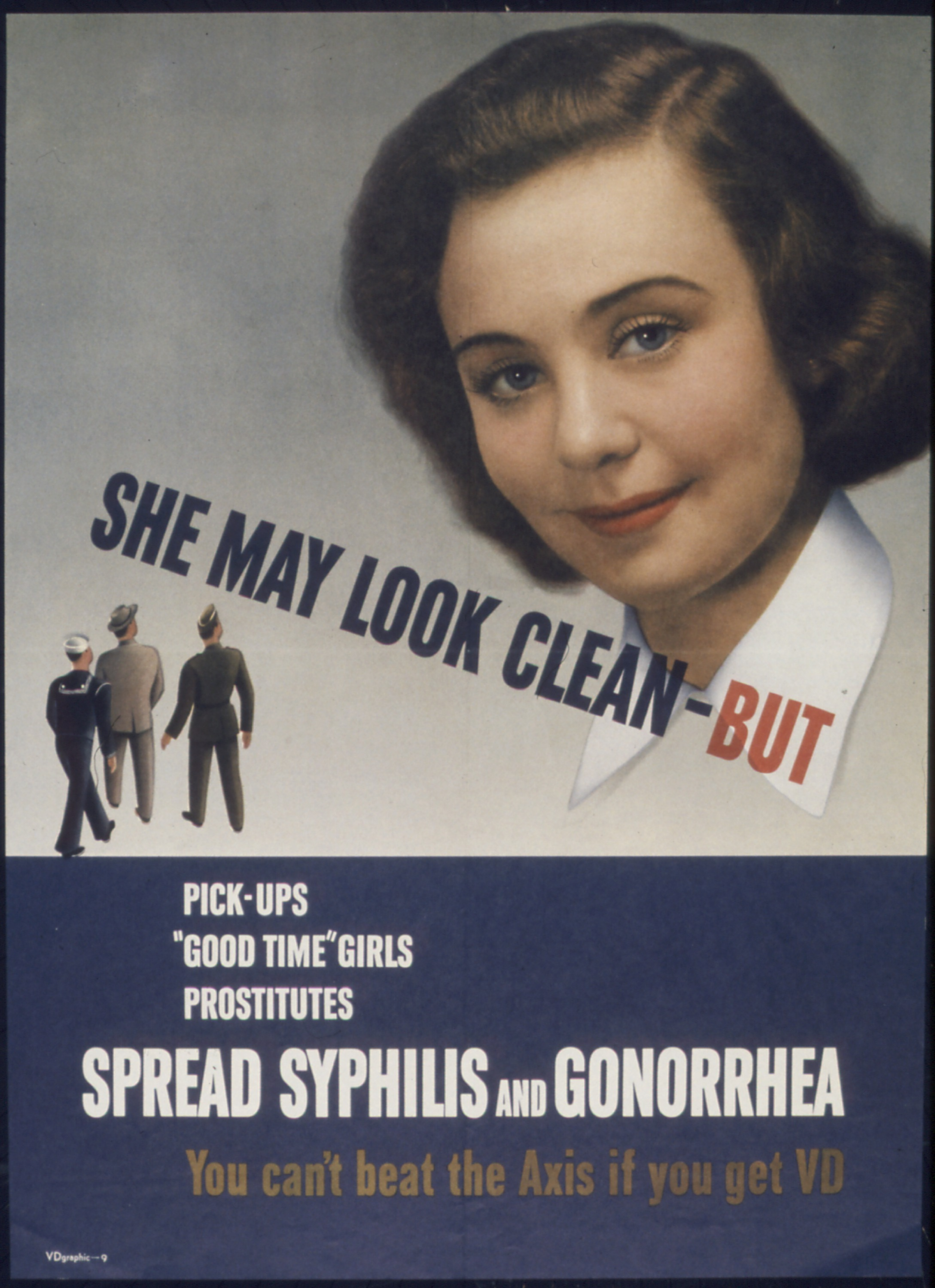
"She may look clean - but"

In the United States, World War II-era venereal disease posters depicting women were created for an overwhelmingly male, military audience. These posters warned men in the Armed Forces away from civilian women, depicting women as the primary carriers and spreaders of venereal diseases. These sentiments were mirrored in the civilian populations as young civilian women were criminalized for engaging in sexual activities. Worse yet this view did little to protect women who engaged in extramarital intercourse. But because many of these women worked in essential military industries, this approach also threatened the morale of the war effort.

== See also ==
- Arsphenamine
- Chamberlain–Kahn Act
- La Follette–Bulwinkle Act
- Magic bullet
- Penicillin
- Tuskegee syphilis experiment
- Venereal Disease Research Laboratory test

== Historical Video Archive ==
☆ Easy to Get (US Army Service Forces, 1947) on YouTube
☆ To the People of the United States - World War II Sexually Transmitted Disease Film on YouTube
☆ WWII Army And Navy Venereal Disease / VD Scare Film 21484 on YouTube
☆ WWII Venereal Disease Film Fight Syphilis 48394 on YouTube
☆ WWII Venereal Disease Film Fight Syphilis (USPHS, 1942) on YouTube
☆ World War II U.S. Army Venereal Disease Scare Film "Pick Up" 88434 on YouTube
☆ World War II U.S. Army Venereal Disease Scare Film "Three Cadets" 45324 on YouTube
