= Scott W. Stern =

American scholar

- Education: Yale University
- Writing career
- Genre: non-fiction

Scott W. Stern is an American scholar. He graduated from Taylor Allderdice High School in 2011. He graduated from Yale University, in American Studies. His thesis on the American Plan won the Norman Holmes Pearson Prize.

== Works ==
- Stern, Scott W. (May 15, 2018). The Trials of Nina McCall: Sex, Surveillance, and the Decades-Long Government Plan to Imprison "Promiscuous" Women. Beacon Press. ISBN 978-080704275-5. OCLC 1001756017.

== Movie announcement ==
In 2017, Cathy Schulman's Welle Entertainment acquired the film rights to The Trials of Nina McCall. Writer Laura Harrington was chosen to adapt the book to film.
