= Establishment of the World Health Organization =

The establishment of the World Health Organization occurred on 7 April 1948, when its new constitution was ratified by a twenty-sixth nation. Its establishment followed a period of discussions and consultation following World War II and the formation of the United Nations, of which it formed part. The WHO formally began its work on September 1, 1948.

== History ==
An international sanitary conference was held in Venice in 1892, promoted in part by the spread of Asiatic cholera earlier in that century. The first international organization to cover this area was the Pan-American Sanitary Bureau in 1902, followed by the Office International d'Hygiène Publique in Paris in 1909. The League of Nations Health Organization was established following the First World War inside the League of Nations framework, although it did not subsume other health organizations. These efforts were hampered by the Second World War, during which UNRRA also played a role in international health initiatives.

During the United Nations Conference on International Organization, references to health had been incorporated into the United Nations Charter at the request of Brazil. It similarly passed a declaration that an international health body would be set up, co-authored by Brazil and China. The Indian politician Jawaharlal Nehru also gave his opinion in favour of starting WHO.

In February 1946, the Economic and Social Council of the United Nations helped draft the constitution of the new body. The draft constitution began to be signed by representative of 61 countries in June 1946, to come into force when ratified by 26 countries. Until that happened, an Interim Commission of 18 countries would prepare. The use of the word "world", rather than "international", emphasised the truly global nature of what the organization was seeking to achieve. The constitution of WHO was developed from four documents, submitted by the French, British, United States and Yugoslav governments. There was a common consensus that membership should not be limited to members of the United Nations and to this effect other countries were allowed to send observers to the drafting process. The International Health Conference met between 19 June and 22 July 1946, attended by representatives of all 51 members of the UN, 13 non-member countries, 3 Allied Commission and 10 international organizations. Dr. Thomas Parran served as president of the conference. The two most discussed issues were the role of the Soviet Union (which accepted a place) and the integration of other international organizations, which was agreed and would be managed. The constitution of the World Health Organization had been signed by all 61 countries by 22 July 1946, which an article in Science described as "an historic day". It thus became the first specialised agency of the United Nations to which every member subscribed. Its constitution formally came into force on the first World Health Day on 7 April 1948, when it was ratified by the 26th member state. The transfer was authorized by a Resolution of the General Assembly. The Office International d'Hygiène Publique was incorporated into the Interim Commission of the World Health Organization on 1 January 1947.

The first meeting World Health Assembly finished on 24 July 1948, having secured a budget of US$5 million (then GBP£1,250,000) for the 1949 year. Dr. Andrija Stampar was the Assembly's first president, and Dr. G. Brock Chisholm was appointed Director-General of WHO, having served as Executive Secretary during the planning stages. Its first priorities were malaria, tuberculosis, sexually transmitted infections, maternal and child health, nutrition and environmental hygiene. Its first legislative act was concerning the compilation of accurate statistics on the spread and morbidity of disease. It pushed quickly to establish five regional offices to complement is central staff in Geneva, Switzerland. The logo of the World Health Organization features the Rod of Asclepius as a symbol for healing.
