= Susan Mokotoff Reverby =

American academic

- Born: 1946 (age 79–80)
- Occupations: Professor, historian
- Employer: Wellesley College
- Known for: Research on the Tuskegee syphilis experiment and Syphilis experiments in Guatemala
- Awards: Lavinia L. Dock Award

Academic background
- Education: Cornell University; New York University; Boston University

Susan Mokotoff Reverby (born 1946) is a Wellesley College professor. She has written on the Tuskegee syphilis experiment and uncovered the syphilis experiments in Guatemala.

== Biography ==
Susan Mokotoff was 14 when she became interested with history at Middletown High School. "I dragged my mother to Philadelphia to see where Benjamin Franklin lived," said Reverby. "I always knew: You had to go to the source."

Mokotoff received a B.S. degree in Industrial and Labor Relations/Labor History from Cornell University in 1967, an M.A. in American Civilization from New York University in 1973, and a Ph.D. in American Studies from Boston University in 1982. She joined Wellesley in 1982. From 1993–1997 she served as the consumer representative on the U.S. Food and Drug Administration’s Obstetrics and Gynecology Devices Advisory Panel.

Her 1987 book Ordered to Care: The Dilemma of American Nursing, 1850-1945 won the Lavinia L. Dock Award from the American Association for the History of Nursing.

== Published works ==
- 1979: Health Care in America: Essays in Social History (with David Rosner)
- 2020: Co-conspirator for Justice: The Revolutionary Life of Dr. Alan Berkman

== See also ==
- Juan María Funes
- John Charles Cutler
