= Gerald Markowitz =

American historian

Gerald Markowitz (born July 12, 1944) is an American historian, currently a distinguished professor at John Jay College of Criminal Justice, City University of New York (CUNY) and also a published author.

After graduating in 1965 with a B.A. from Earlham College, Markowitz matriculated as a graduate student at the University of Wisconsin–Madison. There he graduated in 1967 with an M.A. and in 1971 with a Ph.D. At CUNY's John Jay College of Criminal Justice, he has been a professor of history from 1970 to the present and since 2004 a distinguished professor of history. He chaired John Jay College's Interdepartment of Thematic Studies in 1985–1987, 1989-1992, and 1995-1999. At Columbia University's Mailman School of Public Health, he has held an adjunct professorship in sociomedical science from 2002 to the present.

== Selected publications ==
- Park, Marlene; Markowitz, Gerald E. (1977). New Deal for Art: The Government Art Projects of the 1930s With Examples from New York City and State. The Gallery Association of New York State. ISBN 0934483000. LCCN 76053159.
- Park, Marlene; Markowitz, Gerald E. (1984). Democratic Vistas: Post Offices and Public Art in the New Deal. Temple University Press. ISBN 978-0-87722-348-1.
- Rosner, David; Markowitz, Gerald E., eds. (1987). Dying for Work: Workers' Safety and Health in Twentieth-century America. Indiana University Press. ISBN 0-253-31825-4. LCCN 86010260.
- Rosner, David; Markowitz, Gerald (1994). Deadly Dust: Silicosis and the Politics of Occupational Disease in Twentieth-Century America. Princeton University Press. ISBN 978-0-691-03771-4; 1st edition 1991
- Markowitz, Gerald; Rosner, David (December 16, 2013). Children, Race, and Power: Kenneth and Mamie Clark's Northside Center. Routledge. ISBN 978-1-136-69285-7; 1st edition 2000
- Markowitz, Gerald; Rosner, David (October 10, 2002). Deceit and Denial: The Deadly Politics of Industrial Pollution. University of California Press. ISBN 978-0-520-21749-2.
  - 2013 edition. ISBN 978-0-520-27582-9.
- Rosner, David; Markowitz, Gerald (September 11, 2006). Are We Ready?: Public Health since 9/11. University of California Press. ISBN 978-0-520-94047-5.
- Markowitz, Gerald; Rosner, David (April 30, 2013). Lead Wars: The Politics of Science and the Fate of America's Children. University of California Press. ISBN 978-0-520-95495-3.
