= John Charles Cutler =

American surgeon (1915–2003)

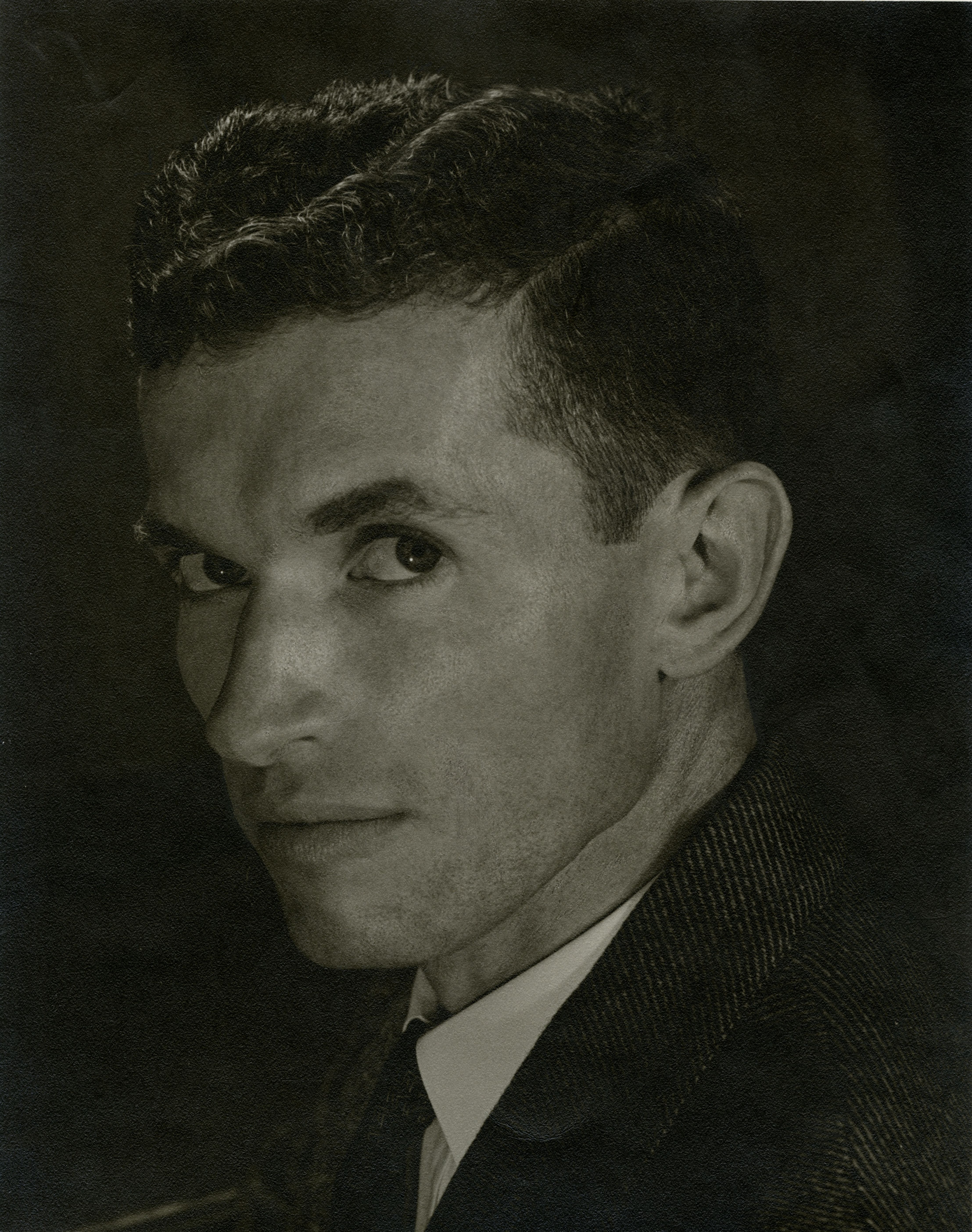
- Born: June 29, 1915; Cleveland, Ohio
- Died: February 8, 2003 (aged 87); Pittsburgh, Pennsylvania
- Education: Western Reserve University, M.D. (1941)
- Employer: United States Public Health Service
- Known for: Human experiments involving the deliberate spread of syphilis and gonorrhea
- Spouse: Eliese S. Cutler
- Parent(s): Grace Amanda Allen; Glenn Allen Cutler

John Charles Cutler (June 29, 1915 – February 8, 2003) was an American surgeon. He was the acting chief of the venereal disease program in the United States Public Health Service. He is known for leading several controversial human experiments of syphilis, done under the auspices of the Public Health Service. He willfully spread syphilis and gonorrhea to unwitting patients, including (but not limited to) soldiers, prisoners, adults with leprosy, mental patients, and orphan children as young as nine in the Guatemala syphilis experiments. He also conducted the Tuskegee syphilis experiments, in which African American men, not informed of the nature of the experiment, were deliberately denied treatment for syphilis.

== Early life and education ==
Cutler was born on June 29, 1915, in Cleveland, Ohio, to Grace Amanda Allen and Glenn Allen Cutler.

He graduated from Western Reserve University Medical School in 1941, and joined the Public Health Service in 1942. In 1943, he worked as a medical officer in the U.S. Public Health Venereal Disease Research Laboratory on Staten Island.

== Syphilis experiments ==
Cutler, together with John Friend Mahoney, oversaw the Terre Haute prison experiments in 1943 and 1944, in which inmates at a federal penitentiary agreed to be injected with strains of gonorrhea in return for $100, a certificate of merit, and a letter of commendation to the parole board. The experiments were discontinued when Cutler's supervisor determined that the method of inducing gonorrhea in humans was unreliable and could not provide meaningful tests of prophylactic agents.

Cutler, supervised by Mahoney, then resumed these experiments, conducted by the United States Public Health Service with funding from the United States National Institutes of Health (NIH), as part of the Guatemala syphilis experiments beginning in 1946, during which American and Guatemalan doctors deliberately infected an estimated 1,500 to 5,000 Guatemalans with syphilis without their informed consent. Unwitting subjects of the experiments included orphans as young as nine, as well as soldiers, prisoners and mental patients.

In one especially "offensive" case from the Guatemala experiments, a mental patient named Bertha was first deliberately infected with syphilis and given penicillin only months later. Cutler, after observing that she "appeared she was going to die", inserted pus from a male gonorrhea victim into her eyes, urethra, and rectum. Four days later, infected in both eyes and bleeding from the urethra, she died.

In another case, several epileptic women in Guatemala were injected with syphilis below the base of their skull. One was left paralyzed for two months by meningitis. Cutler said he was testing a theory that the injections could cure epilepsy.

Approximately half of those infected as part of the study were treated for the diseases they contracted. A total of 83 subjects died, though the exact relationship to the experiment remains undocumented.

In December 1954, Cutler was in charge of experiments at Sing Sing Penitentiary in Ossining, New York to determine whether a vaccine made from the killed syphilis bacterium would protect prisoners against infection when he later exposed them to the bacterium. The physicians conducted experiments over the course of 15 months including 62 volunteer prisoners at the Sing Sing Penitentiary. Those infected were later treated with penicillin. Cutler, who was acting chief, briefed the program to the Federal Public Health Service during the yearly American Academy of Dermatology and Syphilology.

Cutler became assistant surgeon general in 1958.

In the 1960s until November 1972, Cutler was involved in the ongoing Tuskegee syphilis experiment, during which several hundred African-American men who had contracted syphilis were observed, but left untreated.

In “The Deadly Deception”, the 1993 Nova documentary about the Tuskegee experiments, Cutler states, “It was important that they were supposedly untreated, and it would be undesirable to go ahead and use large amounts of penicillin to treat the disease, because you’d interfere with the study.”

In 1967 Cutler was appointed Professor of International Health at the University of Pittsburgh, where he also served as chairman of the Department of Health Administration and acting dean of the Graduate School of Public Health in 1968–1969. He died on February 8, 2003, at Western Pennsylvania Hospital in Pittsburgh. The university started a lecture series in his name after his death, but discontinued it in 2008 when his role in the Tuskegee experiment came to the attention of a new dean.

== See also ==
- Juan María Funes
- La Follette–Bulwinkle Act
- List of medical ethics cases
- Susan Mokotoff Reverby
