= La Follette–Bulwinkle Act =

- Long title: An Act to impose additional duties upon the United States Public Health Service in connection with the investigation and control of the venereal diseases.
- Nicknames: Venereal Diseases Control and Prevention Act of 1938
- Enacted by: the 75th United States Congress
- Effective: May 24, 1938

Citations
- Public law: Pub. L. 75–540
- Statutes at Large: 52 Stat. 439

Codification
- Acts amended: Chamberlain–Kahn Act
- Titles amended: 42 U.S.C.: Public Health and Social Welfare
- U.S.C. sections created: 42 U.S.C. ch. 1, subch. I §§ 25a-25e

Legislative history
- Introduced in the Senate as S. 3290 by Robert M. La Follette Jr. (R–WI) on March 7, 1938; Committee consideration by Senate Commerce, House Interstate and Foreign Commerce; Passed the Senate on March 31, 1938 (Passed); Passed the House on May 16, 1938 (Passed) with amendment; Senate agreed to House amendment on May 17, 1938 (Agreed); Signed into law by President Franklin D. Roosevelt on May 24, 1938

La Follette–Bulwinkle Act or Venereal Diseases Control and Prevention Act of 1938 sanctioned federal assistance to U.S. states establishing preventive healthcare for venereal diseases. The United States federal statute commissioned the United States Public Health Service for demonstrations, investigations, and studies as related to the control, prevention, and treatment of opportunistic infections. The public law amended the Army Appropriations Act of 1918 appending the judicial context which created the Division of Venereal Diseases within the Bureau of the Public Health Service.

== Passage ==
The bill was introduced into the U.S. Senate by Robert M. La Follette Jr. of Wisconsin and supported in the House by Alfred L. Bulwinkle of North Carolina. The S. 3290 legislation was passed during the 75th United States Congressional session and enacted into law by the 32nd President of the United States Franklin Roosevelt on May 24, 1938.

== Sections of the Act ==
The Title 42 Section 25 codified law was penned as five sections establishing federal rulings for the Public Health Service enforcement to control and eradicate venereal diseases in the United States as determined by the Surgeon General of the United States.

42 U.S.C. § 25a ~ Assistance to U.S. states
42 U.S.C. § 25b ~ Basis and determination of annual allotments
42 U.S.C. § 25c ~ Quarterly allotments
42 U.S.C. § 25d ~ Prescribe the rules and regulations
42 U.S.C. § 25e ~ Provisions not to limit or supersede existing functions

== Approval of Wonder Drug ==
After the discovery of Penicillium at London's St. Mary's Hospital in 1928, the United States Congress appealed for the antibacterial discovery seeking to diminish the peril of bacterial infection among sexually exploratory populaces.

The 79th United States Congress passed the Federal Food, Drug, and Cosmetic Act Penicillin Amendment on July 6, 1945. The United States public law required the U.S. Food and Drug Administration to certify and test penicillin samplings validating the effectiveness, potency, purification, and safety of the antibiotic drugs.

== Communicable Diseases & Public Health Service Act ==
The 1960s sexual revolution movement prompt the United States Congress to draft amendments for the Public Health Service Act authorizing control, prevention, and vaccination assistance for communicable diseases. The United States statutes were enacted into law by the 37th President of the United States Richard Nixon and the 38th President of the United States Gerald Ford.

Communicable Diseases Legislative Policies

- Communicable Disease Control Amendments of 1970
- Communicable Disease Control Amendments of 1972
- Disease Control Amendments of 1976

== In popular culture ==
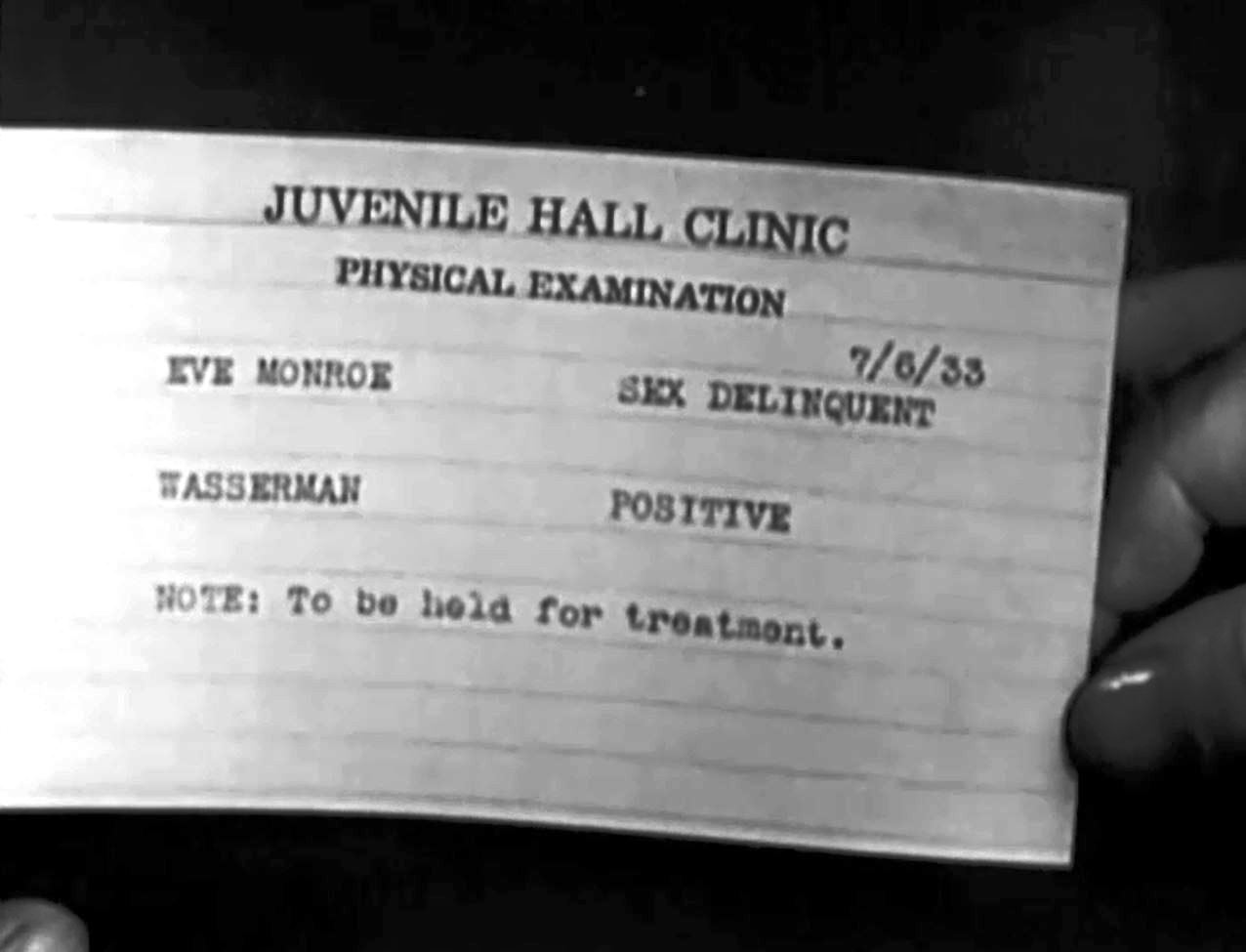
Films such as The Road to Ruin (1934) had plot elements such as this positive Wassermann test for syphilis.

By 1914, American exploitation films were produced promoting awareness about hygiene and venereal disease.

Damaged Goods (1914)
Is Your Daughter Safe? (1927)
Damaged Lives (1933)
The Road to Ruin (1934)
Sex Madness (1938)
Sex Hygiene (1942)
To the People of the United States (1943)
Mom and Dad (1945)

== See also ==
August von Wassermann	Social hygiene movement
Birth control movement in the United States	Thomas Parran Jr.
History of syphilis	Tuskegee syphilis experiment
John Friend Mahoney	Venereal Disease Research Laboratory test
Mann Act	World War II U.S. Military Sex Education

19th & 20th Century Hygiene and Tropical Medicine Organizations

American School Hygiene Association	Hospital for Tropical Diseases
American Sexual Health Association	London School of Hygiene & Tropical Medicine
American Society of Tropical Medicine and Hygiene	Royal Society of Tropical Medicine and Hygiene

19th & 20th Century Medicinal Treatments

Arsphenamine	Magic Bullet
Blue mass	Mercuric Chloride
Calomel	Neosalvarsan
Guaiacum	Sulfonamide

Opportunistic Infectious Diseases

Chlamydia trachomatis	Neisseriaceae
Gram-negative bacteria	Pseudomonadota
Herpesviridae	Spirochaete
Neisseria gonorrhoeae	Treponema pallidum
