= Guatemala syphilis experiments =

Human experimentation conducted by US doctors in Guatemala

Guatemala

The Guatemala syphilis experiments were United States-led human experiments conducted in Guatemala from 1946 to 1948. The experiments were led by physician John Charles Cutler, who also participated in the late stages of the Tuskegee Syphilis Study. Doctors infected 1,300 people, including at least 600 soldiers and people from various impoverished groups (including, but not limited to, sex workers, orphans, inmates of mental hospitals, and prisoners) with syphilis, gonorrhea, and chancroid, without the informed consent of the subjects. Only 700 of them received treatment. In total, 5,500 people were involved in all research experiments, of whom 83 died by the end of 1953, though it is unknown whether or not the injections were responsible for all these deaths. Serology studies continued until 1953 involving the same vulnerable populations in addition to children from state-run schools, an orphanage, and rural towns. However, the intentional infection of patients ended with the original study.

On October 1, 2010, the U.S. President, Secretary of State, and Secretary of Health and Human Services formally apologized to Guatemala for the ethical violations. Guatemala condemned the experiment as a crime against humanity. Multiple unsuccessful lawsuits have since been filed in the US.

Susan Mokotoff Reverby of Wellesley College uncovered information about these experiments in Cutler's archived papers in 2005 while researching the Tuskegee syphilis study. She shared her findings with United States government officials. Francis Collins, the NIH director at the time of the revelations, called the experiments "a dark chapter in history of medicine" and commented that modern rules prohibit conducting human subject research without informed consent.

== Experiment overview ==
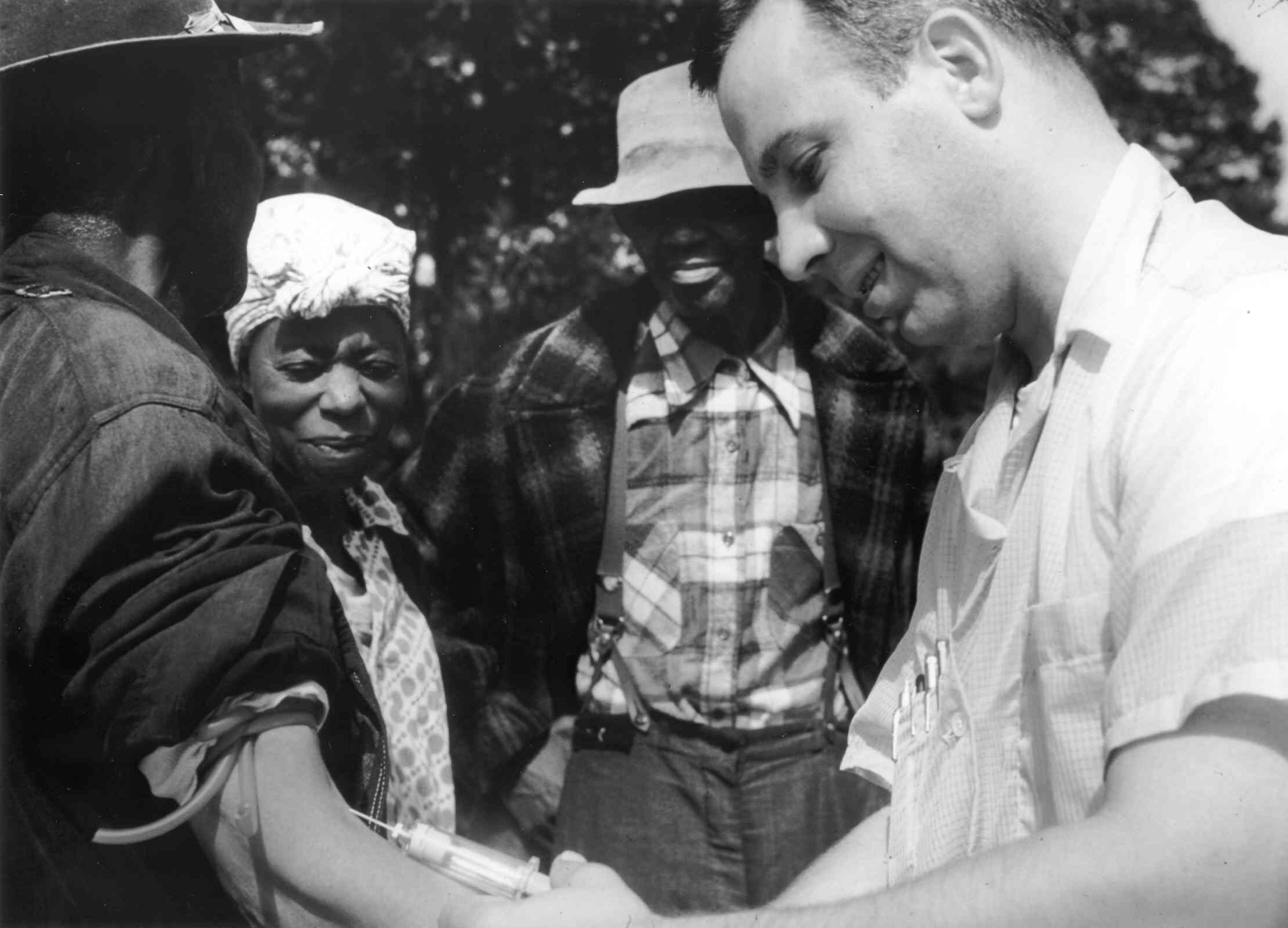
Dr. Walter Edmondson drawing blood from an unidentified participant during the Tuskegee Syphilis Study in 1932.

=== Historical context ===
Rabbits had been used to test treatments for syphilis since the early 20th century, when Sahachiro Hata injected them with arsphenamine, which became known as "the magic bullet" for treating syphilis. They were later injected in the 1940s with penicillin as part of research into methods for preventing syphilis. Around this same time, there was a push by medical professionals, including the U.S. Surgeon General Thomas Parran, to further the knowledge of sexually transmitted diseases and discover more viable prophylaxis and treatment options in humans.

This search for new methods became stronger and won more supporters with the onset of World War II. This was largely due to an effort to protect the U.S. military forces from widespread infections of STDs such as gonorrhea, as well as the particularly painful regimen of prophylaxis that involved in the injection of a silver proteinate into subjects' penises. At the time, it was estimated that venereal diseases would affect 350,000 soldiers, which would equate to eliminating two armed divisions for an entire year. The cost of these losses, which would amount to about $34 million at the time, made research for STD treatments particularly urgent.

The first field trials driven by this push for new developments in STD treatment and preventative measures were the Terre Haute prison experiments from 1943 to 1944, which were conducted and supported by many of the same individuals who would go on to participate in the Guatemalan syphilis experiments only a few years later.

The goal of this experiment was to find a more suitable STD prophylaxis by infecting human subjects recruited from prison populations with gonorrhea. Though at first the idea of using human subjects was controversial, the support of Thomas Parran and Colonel John A. Rodgers, Executive Officer of the U.S. Army Medical Corps, enabled John F. Mahoney and Cassius J. Van Slyke to begin implementing the experiments. John Cutler, a young associate of Mahoney, helped conduct the experiments, and went on to lead the Guatemala syphilis experiments.

The experiments in Terre Haute were the precursor for the Guatemalan experiments. It was the first to demonstrate how earnestly military leaders pushed for new developments to combat STDs and their willingness to infect human subjects. It also explained why the study clinicians would choose Guatemala: to avoid the ethical constraints related to individual consent, other adverse legal consequences, and bad publicity.

=== Study details ===
The study was led by the U.S. Public Health Service, beginning in 1946, up until 1948. The experiments were initially supposed to be held at a prison in Terre Haute, Indiana, but were moved to Guatemala after researchers had a hard time consistently infecting prisoners with gonorrhea. The move to Guatemala was suggested by Juan Funes, head of the Guatemalan Venereal Disease Control Department. The experiments were funded by a grant from the U.S. National Institutes of Health (NIH) to the Pan American Sanitary Bureau; multiple Guatemalan government ministries also became involved.

A study conducted at the Southern Georgia University argues that the selection of Guatemala as a location to conduct the syphilis experiments was a racially motivated decision by U.S. authorities, considering that the study featured white physicians and researchers experimenting on subjects deemed by the U.S. as minority groups. Another study argues that the reasoning was due to Guatemalan prisoners' privilege to pay for prostitutes, as to make it seem that infections were natural due to intercourse with an infected prostitute.

The total number of subjects involved in the experiment is unclear. Some sources argue that about 1,500 study subjects were involved, although the findings were never published. Other sources state that over 5,000 individuals participated in the study, including children.

The purpose of the study was to observe the efficacy of penicillin in preventing infection of sexually transmitted diseases after sexual intercourse. As a result, around 696 Guatemalans were intentionally infected with syphilis, gonorrhea and chancroids. The study also aimed to discover medications other than penicillin for various venereal diseases.

In archived documents, Thomas Parran, Jr., the U.S. Surgeon General at the time of the experiments, acknowledged that the Guatemalan work could not be done domestically; details of the program were also hidden from Guatemalan officials. Furthermore, the participants had not received the opportunity to provide informed consent since the purpose and details of the research were hidden from them as well.

Participants were subjected to the syphilis bacteria through permitted visits with infectious female sex workers, paid by funds from the U.S. government. Other attempts at passing the pathogens to participants included pouring the bacteria onto various lightly abraded body parts, such as male subjects' genitalia, forearms and faces. Some subjects were even infected through forced perforation of the spine. Participants who then tested positive for syphilis were treated with penicillin. However, there is no evidence for adequate treatment having been provided to all subjects or whether infected individuals were cured.

While the study is known to have officially ended in 1948, doctors continued taking tissue samples and performing autopsies on former participants until 1958. Eighty-three individuals died during the course of the experiment, though it is unclear as to whether or not the inoculations were the source of these deaths. Although the study ran for so long and collected massive amounts of data, the researchers never published anything from the Guatemalan syphilis experiments. The likelihood of researchers attempting to protect themselves by not publishing is low due to their later publishing studies over the Tuskegee syphilis studies. No evidence indicates why the experiments ended or if they were shut down.

==== Study methods ====
The initial attempts to infect subjects of the experiment consisted of workers from the USPHS inoculating prostitutes with germs that had grown in rabbits, and then paying them to have sex with prisoners. Prostitutes in Guatemala were required to be tested twice a week for STD infection at a government clinic. For the purposes of the experiments, infected sex workers were instead sent to Cutler by the head of the Guatemalan Ministry of Public Health.

They operated under an assumption that one prostitute could have sex with up to eight men in 71 minutes, creating a large rate of infection. These attempts failed at producing infections quick enough, due to the prisoners refusing repeated blood drawings.

Researchers switched to the direct inoculation of subjects after Cutler accepted an offer from Carlos Salvado, the director of the Asilo de Alienados, a psychiatric hospital in Guatemala City. This hospital was notably understaffed and lacked rudimentary equipment and medicines. $1500 that was originally intended to go to volunteers at the prison was given to the psychiatric hospital for an antiepileptic drug called Dilantin and other necessary equipment.

Doctors would often inject strains of syphilis into patients' spinal fluid or wear away the skin to make infection easier. These strains that they infected patients with were collected from other infected patients or from "street strains", which are not defined.

After the patients were exposed to syphilis, only about half of the patients were given treatment for the infection. Eighty-three patients died during the experiments, but the relation between experiment involvement and death was unsubstantiated.

In 1947, Cutler began experimenting with gonorrhea on Guatemalan soldiers. About 600 soldiers were infected with the disease after a year and a half. Infected sex workers were used to infect the soldiers, and gonorrheal pus from soldiers' penises were injected into other soldiers. Chancroid experiments were also conducted simultaneously on about 80 soldiers, in which doctors would scratch soldiers' arms and infect the wounds. Consent was given by soldiers' officials or patient doctors, but was not reported to have been given by the subjects themselves.

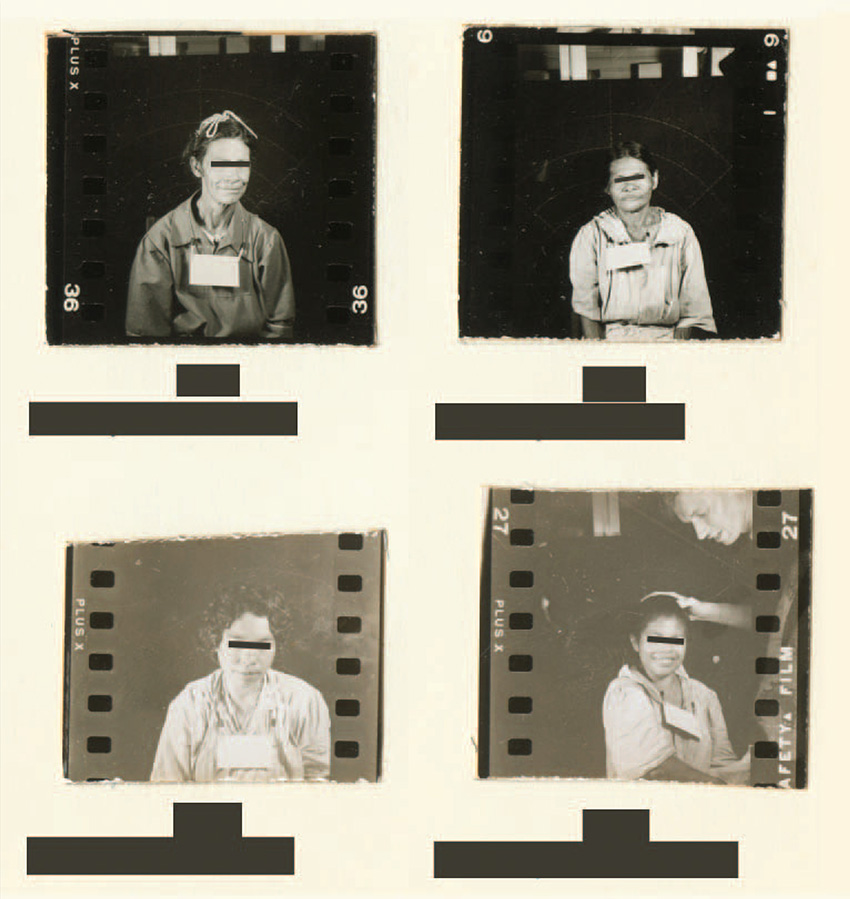
Patients from the Guatemalan psychiatric hospital who participated as test subjects in the syphilis experiments between 1946 and 1948

A documented subject profile provides a detailed description of what the subjects faced within this experiment:

Berta was a female patient in the Psychiatric Hospital... in February 1948, Berta was injected in her left arm with syphilis. A month later, she developed scabies (an itchy skin infection caused by a mite). Several weeks later, Dr. Cutler noted that she also developed red bumps where he had injected her arm, lesions on her arms and legs, and her skin was beginning to waste away from her body. Berta was not treated for syphilis until three months after her injection. Soon after, on August 23, Dr. Cutler wrote that Berta appeared as if she was going to die, but he did not specify why. That same day he put gonorrheal pus from another male subject into both of Berta's eyes, as well as in her urethra and rectum. He also re-infected her with syphilis. Several days later, Berta's eyes were filled with pus from the gonorrhea, and she was bleeding from her urethra. Three days later, on August 27, Berta died.

==== Subjects ====
In total, 1,308 people were confirmed to have been a part of this experiment. Of this group, 678 individuals were documented as getting some form of treatment. However, some reports say that up to 5,128 individuals were monitored for symptoms or became a part of the experiment through natural infection. The populations involved consisted of child and adult commercial sex workers, prisoners, soldiers, orphans, leprosy patients, and mental hospital patients. Many of these subjects were Indigenous Guatemalans and Guatemalans living in poverty. Their ages ranged from 10 to 72, though the average subject was in their 20s.

The Centers for Disease Control and Prevention acknowledges that "the design and conduct of the studies was unethical in many respects, including deliberate exposure of subjects to known serious health threats, lack of knowledge of and consent for experimental procedures by study subjects, and the use of highly vulnerable populations." A total of 83 subjects died, though the exact relationship to the experiment remains undocumented.

=== Medical professionals involved ===
==== Thomas Parran ====
Thomas Parran was the sixth Surgeon General of the United States, who served from 1936 to 1948. Parran's profound interest in STD research can be seen when he testified before Congress in 1938 for expanded funding for public health prevention efforts and scientific research in the STD field.

He had knowledge of the experiment's ethical implications. This can be seen in a 1947 letter to John Charles Cutler (the lead researcher of the Guatemala STD studies) Parran is quoted as having said "You know, we couldn’t do such an experiment in this country,” which would suggest he was aware of some of the ethical issues in the study. However, the full extent of his knowledge is unclear. An official committee at the University of Pittsburgh reported the following on Parran, who was a founder of the University's Graduate School of Public Health: “Dr. Parran’s role, and the extent of his influence in approving, funding, and providing oversight of the Tuskegee and Guatemalan studies, is not entirely clear. Based upon the evidence available today, it might not be possible to determine with certainty Dr. Parran’s level of knowledge and involvement in the studies.” Following their investigation the University of Pittsburg still removed Dr. Parren's name from all school buildings.

After serving as Surgeon General, Thomas Parran began a career working as the first dean of the new School of Public Health at the University of Pittsburgh. He retired from his administrative role at the university and became president of the Avalon Foundation, affiliated with the Mellon family, and became active in the A. W Mellon Educational and Charitable Trust. He died in 1968, and the University of Pittsburgh School of Public Health named Parran Hall after him in 1969. The building was renamed in 2018 due to his involvement in unethical experimentation.

==== John F. Mahoney ====
Prior to his involvement in the Guatemalan syphilis experiment, Mahoney graduated from the University of Pittsburgh medical school in 1914. By 1918 he was the Assistant Surgeon at the United States Public Health Service. In 1929, Mahoney worked as the director of the Venereal Disease Research Lab in Staten Island, where the Terre Haute experiments began in 1943, and where Cutler first assisted him.

After stopping the Terre Haute experiments for lack of accurate infection of subjects with gonorrhea, Mahoney moved on to study the effects of penicillin on syphilis. His research found huge success for penicillin treatments and the US army embraced it in STD prescription. Although this seemed promising, Mahoney and his collaborators questioned the long term prospects for eliminating the disease altogether in individuals.

Mahoney, Cutler, Juan Funes and other researchers felt that a smaller, more controlled group of individuals to study would be more helpful in finding this cure. This led to the use of citizens in Guatemala as subjects. Mahoney was a member of the syphilis study section that approved the Guatemala research Grant. During the Guatemala syphilis study, Mahoney was the primary supervisor of the experiments, receiving Cutler's reports on the experiments. In 1946, while the syphilis study was ongoing, John Mahoney was awarded the Lasker award for discovering penicillin as a cure for syphilis.

After completion of the Guatemala syphilis study, John F. Mahoney became the chairman of the World Health Organization in 1948. In 1950 he became Commissioner of the New York City Department of Health, where he worked until his death in 1957.

==== John Charles Cutler ====
The experiments were led by United States Public Health Service Venereal Diseases Research Laboratory physician John Charles Cutler, who had earlier joined the Public Health Service in 1942 and served as a commissioned officer. Cutler participated in the similar Terre Haute prison experiments, in which volunteer prisoners were infected with gonorrhea spanning from 1943 to 1944. Cutler also later took part in the late stages of the Tuskegee Syphilis Study, where black Americans were lied to about getting available treatment for syphilis. Over 100 people died due to lack of treatment. In a 1993 documentary about the Tuskegee syphilis study titled "Deadly Deception", Cutler defends his actions saying, "It was important that they were supposedly untreated, and it would be undesirable to go ahead and use large amounts of penicillin to treat the disease, because you'd interfere with the study."

While the Tuskegee experiment followed the natural progression of syphilis in those already infected, in Guatemala doctors deliberately infected healthy people with the diseases, some of which can be fatal if untreated. His team created a laboratory in Guatemala supplied by the United States military to discover if there were different transmission rates when the disease was presented to different infectious sites. Cutler created the protocol for infection site research. Cutler and his team discovered that the disease takes 93%-100% if infected through scarification or intracutaneous injection into the foreskin. After the transmission was studied, Cutler focused on the diseases' treatability. People were then recruited and infected and either put into a treatment group or a control group. The treatment group was given orvus-mapharsen or penicillin to see its effects, and the control group was given nothing to stop the disease. The researchers paid prostitutes infected with syphilis to have sex with prisoners, while other subjects were infected by directly inoculating them with the bacterium. Through intentional exposure to gonorrhea, syphilis, and chancroid, a total of 1,308 people were involved in the experiments. Of that group, with an age range of 10–72, 678 individuals (52%) can be said to have received a form of treatment. However, Cutler claimed all had been treated. Hidden from the public, Cutler used healthy individuals in order to improve what he called "pure science". Cutler participated in intentional infection experiments in Guatemala until his departure in December 1948.

After the Guatemala syphilis study, Cutler was asked by the World Health Organization to head an India-based program for demonstrating venereal disease for Southeast Asia in 1949.

John Cutler went on to become Assistant Surgeon General of the U.S. Public Health Service in 1958. In 1967, he would end his tenure when he was appointed professor of International Health at the University of Pittsburgh Graduate School of Public Health. In 1968, he became acting dean of the school and served until 1969. After his death in 2008, his roles in the Tuskegee experiment were publicized and he was stripped of his legacy.

==== Genevieve Stout ====
Genevieve Stout was a bacteriologist for the Pan-American Sanitary Bureau who promoted and established serological research in Guatemalan laboratories. She initiated the VDRL (Venereal Disease Research Laboratory) and Training Center within Central America starting in 1948 and stayed in Guatemala until 1951. Mahoney appointed her to manage the laboratory in Guatemala after Cutler left in 1948. Here she conducted several independent serological experiments for STD research with the help of Funes and Salvado.

==== Juan María Funes and Carlos Salvado ====
Guatemalan doctors Juan María Funes and Carlos Salvado were also employees of the Pan-American Sanitary Bureau, who remained in Guatemala after their work with Cutler. Funes was Chief of the Venereal Disease section at the Guatemalan National Department of Health and was responsible for referring sex workers with STDs from the Venereal Disease and Sexual Prophylaxis Hospital (VDSPH) to Cutler. Salvado was the director of the Psychiatric Hospital in Guatemala where parts of the syphilis study were conducted. Salvado was an active participant in the intentional exposure experiments.

In order to advance in their careers, they opted to stay and continue observations on subjects of the syphilis experiments, including data collection from orphans, inmates, psychiatric patients, and school children. These periodic data collections consisted of blood specimens and lumbar punctures from participants. Data was shipped back to the United States, where many of these blood samples tested positive for syphilis. Funes and Salvado continued collecting samples from participants until 1953.

== Aftermath ==
=== Continued research ===
After the conclusion of the Guatemalan syphilis experiments, many of the samples taken during the experiments were then moved to the United States. Records show that these samples were then given to laboratories across the United States, where they were used for research. Many of the Laboratories using the samples from the Guatemalan syphilis experiments were later given samples from the Tuskegee syphilis experiments. Due to a lack of regulations involving laboratory samples, it is unknown if the samples from the studies are still being used today; however, records show that they were in use by at least 1957.

=== Apology and response ===
In October 2010, the U.S. government formally apologized and announced that the violation of human rights in that medical research was still to be condemned, regardless of how much time had passed. Following the apology, Barack Obama requested an investigation to be conducted by the Presidential Commission for the Study of Bioethical Issues on November 24, 2010.

The Commission concluded nine months later that the experiments "involved gross violations of ethics as judged against both the standards of today and the researchers' own understanding". In a joint statement, Secretary of State Hillary Clinton and Secretary of Health and Human Services Kathleen Sebelius said:

Although these events occurred more than 64 years ago, we are outraged that such reprehensible research could have occurred under the guise of public health. We deeply regret that it happened, and we apologize to all the individuals who were affected by such abhorrent research practices. The conduct exhibited during the study does not represent the values of the US, or our commitment to human dignity and great respect for the people of Guatemala.

President Barack Obama apologized to President Álvaro Colom, who had called the experiments "a crime against humanity".

It is clear from the language of the report that the U.S. researchers understood the profoundly unethical nature of the study. In fact the Guatemalan syphilis study was being carried out just as the "Doctors' Trial" was unfolding at Nuremberg (December 1946 – August 1947), when 23 German physicians stood trial for participating in Nazi programs to euthanize or medically experiment on concentration camp prisoners."

As a response to the dehumanization by human experiment, the Nuremberg Code and Helsinki Code in 1971 were developed to govern ethics in medical research. Research like this deserves the need for informed consent in any type of research in general, and it should prohibit experiments where injury, disability, or death to the participant is reasonably expected. Nevertheless, "science and society should never outweigh the wellbeing of the subject". "The way that this case in Peru was handled though, supports the view that – include monetary redress and criminal investigations – in Guatemala matter. Some would also argue that the Guatemala study constituted torture or cruel, inhuman and degrading treatment, and the US has an obligation under international law to pursue criminal investigations and provide the victims with adequate financial compensation."

The U.S. government asked the Institute of Medicine to conduct a review of these experiments beginning January 2011. While the Institute of Medicine conducted their review, the Presidential Commission for the Study of Bioethical Issues was asked to convene a panel of international experts to review the current state of medical research on humans around the world and ensure that these sorts of incidents do not occur again. The Commission report, Ethically Impossible: STD Research in Guatemala from 1946 to 1948, published in September 2011, aimed to answer the following four questions:

1. What occurred in Guatemala between 1946 and 1948 involving a series of STD exposure studies funded by the U.S. PHS?
2. To what extent were U.S. government officials and others in the medical research establishment at that time aware of the research protocols and to what extent did they actively facilitate or assist in them?
3. What was the historical context in which these studies were done?
4. How did the studies comport with or diverge from the relevant medical and ethical standards and conventions of the time?

The investigation concluded that "the Guatemala experiments involved unconscionable basic violations of ethics, even as judged against the researchers' own recognition of the requirements of the medical ethics of the day." Even besides the fact that U.S. never truly apologized for the study, as human rights activists have called for subjects' families to be compensated. As of 2017, the families still have not been compensated even though there have been several lawsuits filed.

=== Lawsuits ===
==== Manuel Gudiel Garcia v. Kathleen Sebelius ====
Many Guatemalans believed that the U.S. apology was not enough. In March 2011, seven plaintiffs filed a federal class-action lawsuit against the U.S. government claiming damages for the Guatemala experiments. This case argued that the United States was at fault due to not asking for consent. This lawsuit asked for money damages to compensate for medical injuries and loss of livelihood, as most of the families were living in poverty. The suit was dismissed when United States District Judge Reggie Walton determined that the U.S. government has immunity from liability for actions committed outside of the U.S.

==== Estate of Arturo Giron Alvarez v. The Johns Hopkins University ====
In April 2015, 774 plaintiffs launched a lawsuit against Johns Hopkins University, the pharmaceutical company Bristol-Myers Squibb, and the Rockefeller Foundation, seeking $1 billion in damages, seeking to hold the university accountable for the experiment itself because the doctors held important roles on panels that reviewed the federal spending on research for other sexually transmitted diseases. The plaintiffs claimed that Johns Hopkins was actively involved in these experiments, stating "[they] did not limit their involvement to design, planning, funding and authorization of the Experiments; instead, they exercised control over, supervised, supported, encouraged, participated in and directed the course of the Experiments." The hope was that compensation could be attained by targeting private institutions rather than the federal government.

In January 2019, U.S. District Judge Theodore Chuang rejected the defendants' argument that a recent Supreme Court decision shielding foreign corporations from lawsuits in U.S. courts over human rights abuses abroad also applied to domestic corporations absent congressional authorization. However, the District Court subsequently ruled in April 2022 in favor of the defendants, holding that John and his colleagues were not acting on behalf of the Rockefeller Foundation and the employees of Johns Hopkins had not aided or abetted any violations of the law committed by Mahoney or Cutler.

== See also ==
- Human experimentation in the United States
- Project MKUltra
- The Plutonium Files
- Tuskegee Syphilis Study
- Medical ethics
- Porton Down
- Japanese human experimentations
- Unit 731
- Nazi human experimentation
- Nuremberg Code
- Guatemala–United States relations
