= Chamberlain–Kahn Act =

US Federal public health law

- Other short titles: Chamberlain Act of 1918; Public Health and Research Act of 1918
- Long title: An Act making appropriations for the support of the Army for the fiscal year ending June thirtieth, nineteen hundred and nineteen.
- Nicknames: Army Appropriations Act of 1918
- Enacted by: the 65th United States Congress
- Effective: July 9, 1918

Citations
- Public law: Pub. L. 65–193
- Statutes at Large: 40 Stat. 845

Legislative history
- Introduced in the House as H.R. 12281 by Stanley Dent Jr. (D-AL) on May 25, 1918; Passed the House on May 31, 1918 (Passed); Passed the Senate on June 29, 1918 (Passed); Reported by the joint conference committee on June 29, 1918; agreed to by the Senate on July 6, 1918 (Agreed) and by the House on July 6, 1918 (Agreed); Signed into law by President Woodrow Wilson on July 9, 1918

Major amendments
- La Follette–Bulwinkle Act

The Chamberlain–Kahn Act of 1918 is a U.S. federal law passed on July 9, 1918, by the 65th United States Congress. The law implemented a public health program that came to be known as the American Plan, whose stated goal was to combat the spread of venereal disease.

The Chamberlain–Kahn Act gave the government the power to quarantine any woman suspected of having a sexually transmitted disease (STD). A medical examination was required, and if it revealed an STD, this discovery could constitute proof of prostitution. The purpose of this law was to prevent the spread of venereal diseases among U.S. soldiers. During World War I, the American Plan authorized the military to arrest any woman within five miles of a military cantonment. If found infected, a woman could be sentenced to a hospital or a "farm colony" until cured. By the end of the war 15,520 women had been imprisoned, most having never received medical hospitalization.

The act is named for Senator George Earle Chamberlain of Oregon and Representative Julius Kahn of California.

== Historical context ==
The United States entered World War I with an undersized army, resulting in the first compulsory military draft since the American Civil War. The army grew from 128,000 members to four million by the end of the war. Large training camps were built throughout the US in order to train the vast number of new recruits. These large, isolated camps populated by young men were often associated with excessive alcohol consumption and illicit sexual activities with local women. The culture of military camps coupled with rumors of widespread venereal disease among the militaries of Europe inspired the creation of the Commission on Training Camp Activities, which sought to investigate the sexual and moral cultures of these training camps. The commission report was written by Raymond Fosdick, the assistant to the Secretary of War Newton Baker. In the report, Fosdick urges preventative measures be taken against prostitution and the spread of venereal disease: "take all steps necessary to suppress prostitution in the neighborhood of military training camps...We know something of the experience through which our allies have gone. In some cases as much as thirty three and a third percent of the men have been made ineffective through venereal disease. We cannot afford to have any condition of that kind in connection with American troops." Shortly after the report was written, The Commission on Training Activities implemented the Chamberlain–Kahn Act.

== Law ==
The Chamberlain–Kahn Act of 1918 contains a series of measures intended to stop the spread of venereal disease. Firstly, it created the Interdepartmental Hygiene Board that controlled the allocation of funds for its stated purpose. Secondly, the act authorized the quarantine of citizens suspected of having venereal disease: "That the Secretary of War and the Secretary of the Navy are hereby authorized and directed to adopt measures for the purpose of assisting the various States in caring for civilian persons whose detention, isolation, quarantine, or commitment to institutions may be found necessary for the protection of the military and naval forces of the United States against venereal diseases." The act allocates $1,000,000 to fund this quarantine effort. Thirdly, the act created Division of Venereal Disease in the Bureau of the Public Health Service. The stated goal of the Division of Venereal Disease was: "(1) to study and investigate the cause, treatment, and prevention of venereal diseases; (2) to cooperate with State boards or departments of health for the prevention and control of such diseases within the States; and (3) to control and prevent the spread of these diseases in interstate traffic."

== Repercussions ==
The American Plan was a 1918 US federal carceral program first instituted by the Chamberlain–Kahn Act, its stated goal was to fight venereal diseases. It legally sanctioned military, police and health officers to arrest any women 'suspected' of prostitution, force them to undergo invasive STI screenings, and jail them if positive. Over 30,000 women were detained under this act during WW1. It lasted into the 1950s.

Under this law, women suspected to be prostitutes could be stopped, detained, inspected, and could be sent to a rehabilitation center if they failed their examination. Any evidence of venereal disease found during one of these exams could constitute proof of prostitution. By 1919, thirty states had constructed facilities for the purpose of detaining and treating women with venereal disease; an estimated 30,000 women were detained and examined during the war. During the course of the war, 110 red light districts throughout America were shut down. Despite these efforts, the availability of prostitutes remained fairly constant around military camps, and rates of venereal disease remained quite high.

In his 2018 book The Trials of Nina McCall, Scott W. Stern describes the American Plan as a decades-long government-sponsored campaign, under which public health officials were authorized to detain and examine women suspected of carrying a venereal disease and confine those who were positively diagnosed or otherwise judged to be a public health threat to a hospital or jail.

== See also ==
- Mann Act
- Rupert Blue
- Venereal Disease Research Laboratory test
- World War II U.S. Military Sex Education
