= John Friend Mahoney =

American physician (1889–1957)

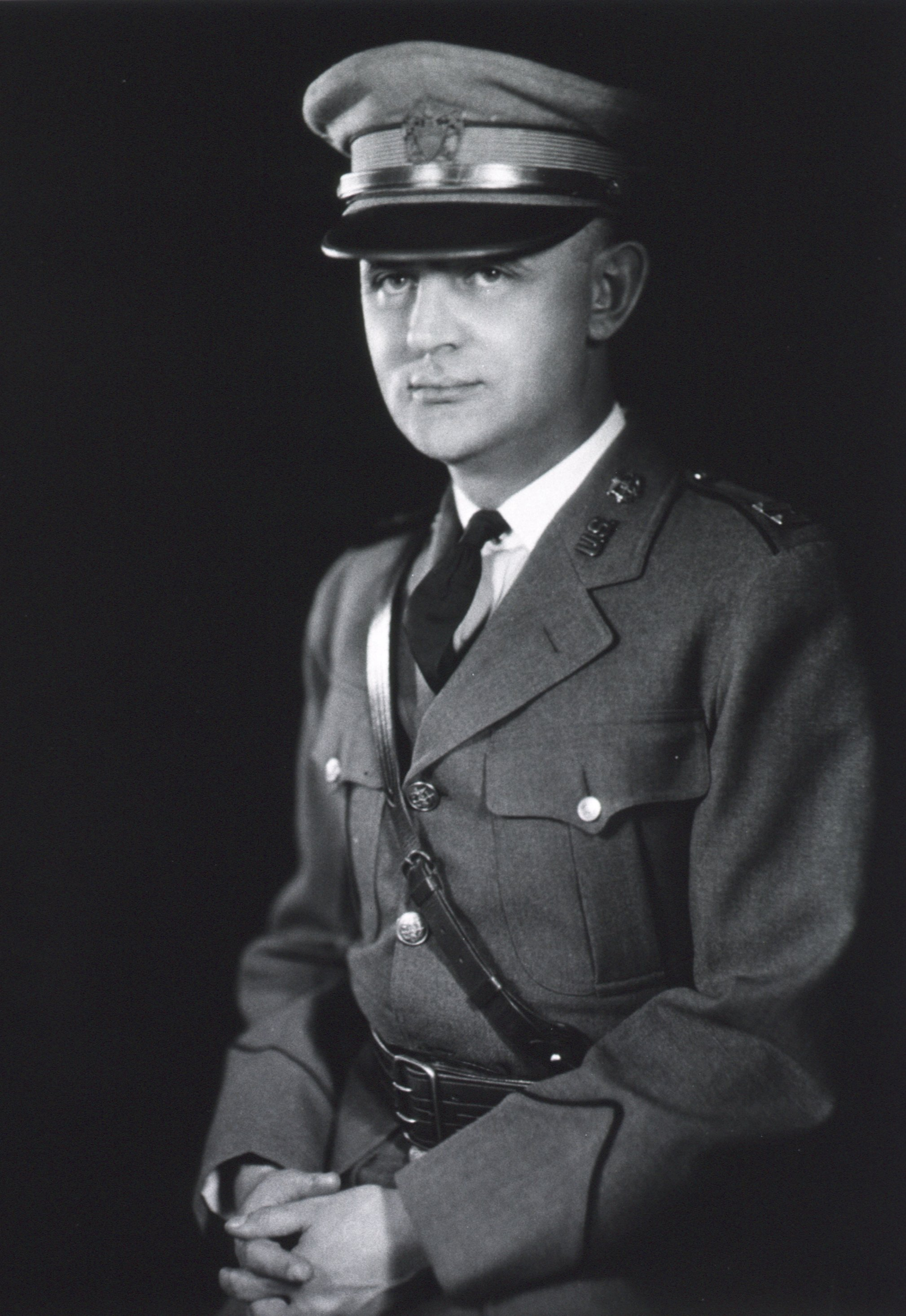

Commissioner of the New York City Department of Health
- In office 1950–1953
- Preceded by: Harry S. Mustard
- Succeeded by: Leona Baumgartner

Personal details
- Born: August 1, 1889 Fond du Lac, Wisconsin, U.S.
- Died: February 23, 1957 (aged 67)
- Resting place: Arlington National Cemetery
- Education: Marquette University (MD)
- Awards: Lasker Award (1946)

Military service
- Allegiance: United States
- Branch/service: U.S. Public Health Service

John Friend Mahoney (August 1, 1889 – February 23, 1957) was an American physician best known as a pioneer in the treatment of syphilis with penicillin. He won the 1946 Lasker Award.

Mahoney led human experiments in Terre Haute prison and was a supervisor of the Guatemala syphilis experiments, the latter of which involved the deliberate spread of syphilis and gonorrhea to unwitting patients, which included orphan children. These experiments are today widely deemed as unethical.

== Early life and education ==
The son of David and Mary Ann Mahoney, John Friend Mahoney was born on August 1, 1889, in Fond du Lac, Wisconsin. In 1914 Mahoney graduated from Marquette University with attached clinical training at the Milwaukee County Hospital and at the Chicago Lying-in Hospital.

== Career ==
From 1917 he worked as an assistant surgeon in the U.S. forces in Europe during World War I. After returning in 1919, he served in the United States Public Health Service on various quarantine stations and marine hospitals, including Ellis Island. In this context, Mahoney was sent to Europe from 1925 to 1929. While in England, Ireland and Germany, Mahoney studied syphilis treatment.

In 1929 Mahoney became director of the Venereal Disease Research Laboratory of the Food and Drug Administration. The laboratory improved serological tests for syphilis and demonstrated, with the advent of sulfonamide treatment in the United States in the 1930s, its efficacy in treating gonorrhea. He was also medical director of the Marine Hospital in Staten Island.

Mahoney was made aware of the possibilities of penicillin treatment by a paper by Wallace Herrell and colleagues from the Mayo Clinic. Particular attention was on the treatment of gonorrhea patients where the pathogen was resistant to sulfonamides. Mahoney confirmed this and also began to test penicillin for syphilis treatment, first in vitro without success, then in rabbits. He led the Terre Haute Prison experiments and supervised Dr. John C. Cutler in the Guatemala Syphilis Experiment. By 1929, Dr. Mahoney worked as the director of the Venereal Disease Research Lab in Staten Island, where the Terre Haute experiments began in 1943; this is also where Cutler first assisted him.

After stopping the Terre Haute experiments for lack of accurate infection of subjects with gonorrhea, Dr. Mahoney moved on to study the effects of penicillin on syphilis. His research found huge success for penicillin treatments and the U.S. Army embraced it in STD prescription. Although this seemed prosperous, Mahoney and his collaborators questioned the long term effectiveness of eliminating the disease altogether in individuals. Mahoney, Cutler and other researchers felt that a smaller, more controlled group of individuals to study would be more helpful in finding this cure. This led to the use of citizens in Guatemala as subjects; once this approach was proven successful he began clinical trials.

Mahoney continued to supervise Cutler, who resumed these experiments, conducted by the United States Public Health Service with funding from the United States National Institutes of Health (NIH). Beginning in 1946, doctors deliberately infected an estimated 1500 to 5000 Guatemalans with syphilis without the informed consent of the subjects. Unwitting subjects of the experiments included orphans as young as nine, as well as soldiers, prisoners and mental patients.

Approximately half of those infected as part of the study were treated for the diseases they contracted. A total of 83 subjects died, though the exact relationship to the experiment remains undocumented. This study not only violated the Hippocratic Oath but it echoed Nazi crimes exposed around the same time at the Nuremberg trials.

At a meeting of the American Public Health Association in New York in October 1943, Mahoney presented the first results of his research in four patients in the early stages of syphilis disease. Time magazine reported the findings. With Mahoney's involvement, the Committee on Medical Research began an extensive clinical trial with over 1400 patients in different hospitals. Mahoney led the study at the Staten Island Marine Hospital. In June 1944, penicillin was introduced as a standard treatment for syphilis in the United States Army.

In 1946 Mahoney was one of the first winners of the Lasker Award, which recognizes significant contribution to medical science. In 1948 he was chairman of the World Health Organization Expert Committee on Venereal Diseases at its first meeting in Geneva, Switzerland. In December 1949 he retired from the Public Health Service. In 1950 he was appointed commissioner of the New York City Department of Health, serving until 1954. He returned to the department's Bureau of Laboratories, serving as its director until his death in 1957.

== Personal life ==
He was married and had a son and daughter.

== Bibliography ==
- John Parascandola: John Mahoney and the introduction of penicillin to treat syphilis
- Obituary in the British Journal of Venereal Diseases (PDF), Band 33, 1957, S. 127.
