= Terre Haute prison experiments =

Human experimentation conducted on prisoners in Terre Haute, Indiana

The Terre Haute prison experiments were conducted by Dr. John C. Cutler in 1943 and 1944 under Dr. John F. Mahoney, the head of the Venereal Disease Research Laboratory of the US Public Health Service, to determine the effectiveness of treatments for sexually transmitted diseases. The experiment focused on creating prophylaxis treatments for gonorrhea. The test subjects were prisoners at the U.S. Penitentiary in Terre Haute, Indiana. They were given disclosures and consented to the experiments. A total of 241 prisoners participated in the study and received $100, a certificate of merit, and a letter of commendation to the parole board at the end of the study. The researchers deposited various strains and concentrations of gonorrhea into the penises of the test subjects. After several months, Mahoney noted that the method of inducing gonorrhea in humans was unreliable and could not provide meaningful tests of prophylactic agents.

The Terre Haute experiments laid the foundation for and bore many similarities to the Guatemala syphilis experiments, including many of the same researchers, goals, and methods.

== Experiment overview ==
=== Historical context ===
The Terre Haute prison experiments began during World War II to create a prophylaxis treatment for gonorrhea. Venereal diseases had been an issue previously during World War I and had cost the army seven million days of active duty. Gonorrhea did not have a medical treatment at this time and was difficult to study because only humans can contract it. This initiated extensive research on how to prevent and treat gonorrhea to reduce infection rates in the armed forces.

During an NRC meeting about venereal diseases, two researchers from New York proposed the idea of using volunteer prison inmates as test subjects. They argued that inmates were the ideal test subject because they could be well monitored and prohibited from sexual activity. The NRC agreed with their argument but worried about the public reaction to this experiment. Gonorrhea was becoming a growing problem amongst all areas of the population and the only way to study it was through human experimentation. The NRC eventually endorsed this study because they thought the benefits of creating prophylaxis treatments for gonorrhea outweighed the risks of a negative public reaction.

=== Study details ===
The study was conducted in Terre Haute, Indiana at the federal penitentiary in September 1943. There were three locations considered for this experiment, but Terre Haute was chosen due to their superior medical facility. There were 241 test subjects chosen from the prison. The requirements to participate in the experiment were that you be at least 21 years old and fully understood the risks involved. The prisoners signed waivers and were told they would receive $100 and a letter of recommendation for parole after completing the experiment.

The researcher's initial task was to find a consistent method of inoculation. The researchers had taken samples of gonorrhea from recently arrested sex workers. They gathered many different strains of gonorrhea and experimented with inoculating the test subjects with different concentrations. The method of inoculation used was to apply a sample of gonorrhea to the end of the test subjects' penises. However, after five months of using this method for inoculation, researchers became concerned with the inconsistency. The leader of the experiment, Dr. Mahoney, reported his unsuccessful attempts at inoculation to the National Research Council. The NRC encouraged the continuation of the experiment. Dr. Cutler, who had been working alongside Dr. Mahoney, tried additional attempts at inoculation but was unsuccessful.

After many different failed attempts at inoculation, Dr. Mahoney decided to end the experiment. Dr. Mahoney realized that without a consistent way to inoculate test subjects, they could not effectively test prophylaxis treatments. The Terre Haute Prison experiments were conducted for only ten months and officially ended in July 1944.

=== Study clinicians ===
This study was conducted by Dr. John Cutler, Dr. John Mahoney, Dr. Joseph Earle Moore, and Dr. Cassius J. Van Slyke.

== Aftermath ==
=== Continued research ===
After the Terre Haute Prison Experiments, Dr. Mahoney and Dr. Cutler continued their experiments on venereal diseases in the Guatemala Syphilis experiments.

== See also ==
- Tuskegee Syphilis Study
- Guatemala syphilis experiments
