= Mellon Trust =

The Mellon Trust was a charitable trust set up in 1930 and dissolved circa 1979 to support small arts organizations in the Pittsburgh region.

The founder, Andrew W. Mellon, was a financier and former U.S. Treasury Secretary who died in 1937. For the remainder of its existence, the fund was administered by Theodore L. Hazlett Jr, and was dissolved following his death. Its assets were distributed among other charitable institutions in Pittsburgh and the National Gallery of Art (NGA) in Washington.

Between 1931 and 1937, the artworks now known as the Andrew W. Mellon collection, part of the NGA, were owned by the Mellon Trust, having been deeded them by Mellon in 1931. The collection was gifted to the NGA in 1937.

The A.W. Mellon Educational and Charitable Trust fund was established on June 17, 1980, with a $2 million donation from the dissolution of the Mellon Trust.
