= K&L Gates Center =

Skyscraper office building located in Downtown Pittsburgh, Pennsylvania

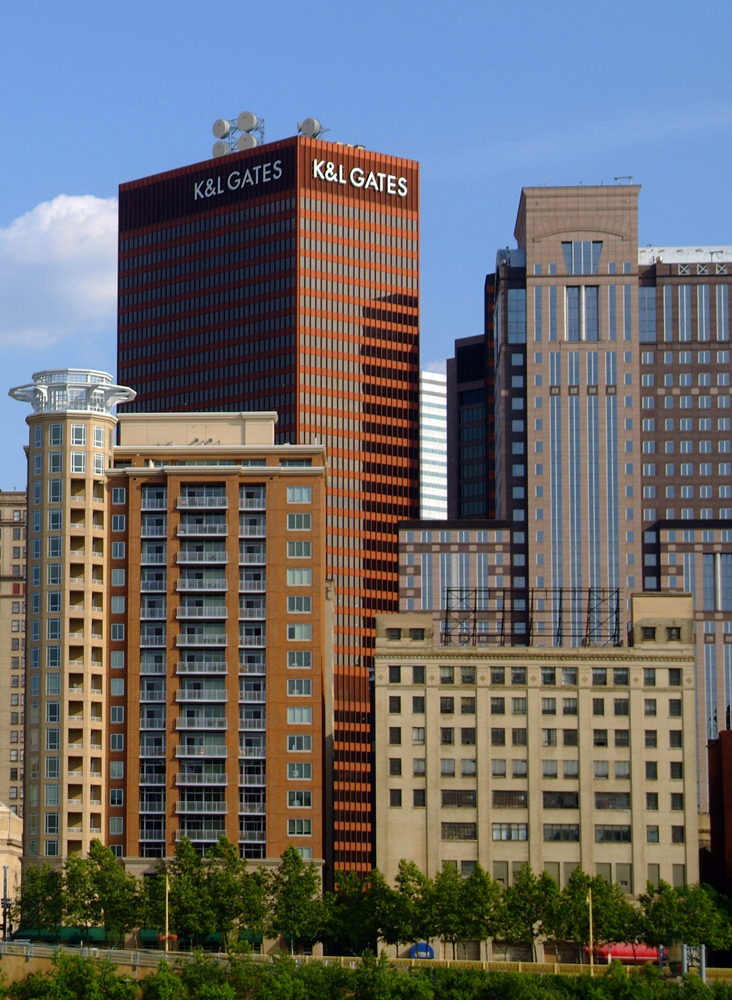
- The K&L Gates Center with its current sign
- Interactive map of the K&L Gates Center area

General information
- Type: Office
- Location: 210 6th Avenue Pittsburgh, Pennsylvania
- Coordinates: 40.4420°N 80°W
- Completed: 1968
- Owner: Kojaian Cos

Height
- Roof: 511 ft (156 m)

Technical details
- Floor count: 39
- Floor area: 638,443 ft (194,597 m)
- Lifts/elevators: 16 passenger 1 freight 1 parking garage elevator and 1 bank elevator

Design and construction
- Architects: William Lescaze and Associates

K&L Gates Center is a skyscraper office building located in Downtown Pittsburgh, Pennsylvania. The building (long known as One Oliver Plaza and briefly as FreeMarkets Center and later Ariba Center) was completed in 1968. It has 39 floors, and rises 511 feet (156 meters) above downtown Pittsburgh. The building sits at the intersection of Liberty Avenue, Sixth Avenue and Wood Street. Facing the EQT Plaza tower across the street, it shares a city block with One PNC Plaza, Two PNC Plaza and Three PNC Plaza; this "superblock" was created by the closing of part of Oliver Avenue in the late 1960s. Located across the building is Wood Street Station, a subway station on Pittsburgh's light rail network.

In 2007, the international law firm K&L Gates entered into an agreement to become the largest tenant in the building by 2010. In 2009, extensive construction began on the building lobby, the exterior facade of the first two floors and the plazas surrounding the building. The K&L Gates signage replaced Ariba at the top of the building. K&L Gates also removed a sculpture in the building's lobby in order to maintain a consistent decor. The artwork, a large enamel-on-steel mural by Virgil Cantini, has been donated to the University of Pittsburgh by the building's owner.

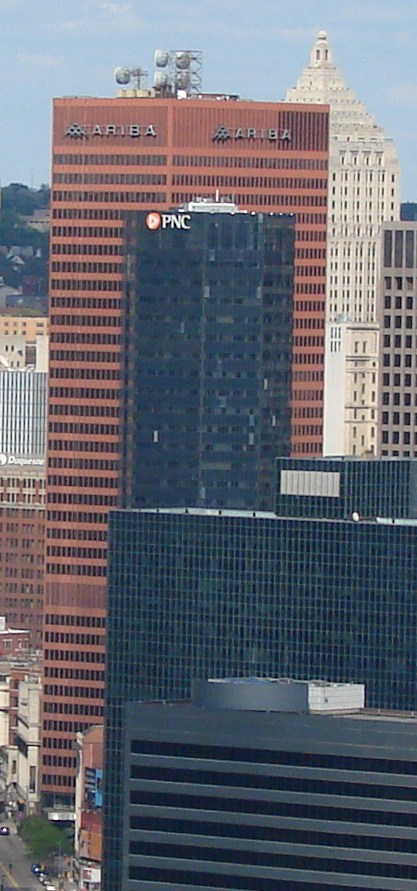
The building when it was known as the Ariba Center

The lobby was reopened in February, 2010. In March 2010, K&L Gates became the building's largest tenant, having sponsored both the renaming of the building and a revitalization of the building's ground-floor lobby, exterior entry facade and adjoining plaza.

Among the building's artwork is an illuminated entry portal connecting the building with the street, with five "Light Columns" created by artist Cerith Wyn Evans illuminating the interior space as well as the outside plaza. These columns are complemented by the neon wall sculpture "Mobius Strip", also by Wyn Evans, at the entry reception desk.

== See also ==
- List of tallest buildings in Pittsburgh

Preceded by Grant Building	Pittsburgh Skyscrapers by Height; 511 feet (156 m); 39 floors	Succeeded by Citizens Bank Tower
Preceded by Federal Building	Pittsburgh Skyscrapers by Year of Completion; 1968	Succeeded by Westinghouse Tower
