= Grant Building (Pittsburgh) =

Skyscraper in Pittsburgh

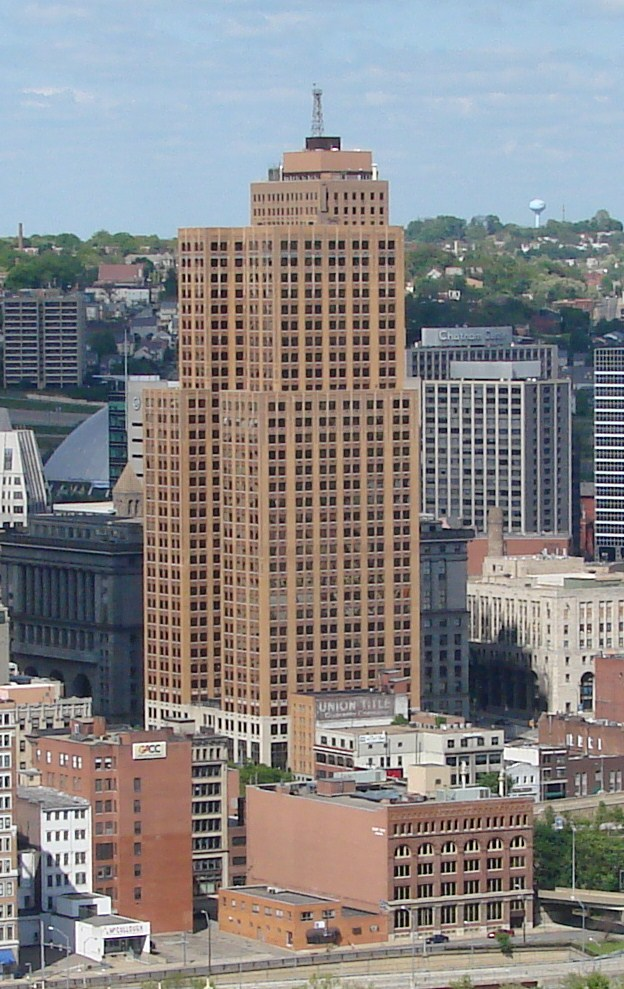
- View of the Grant Building from Mt. Washington.

General information
- Type: Commercial offices
- Architectural style: Art Deco / Art Moderne
- Location: 310 Grant Street, Pittsburgh, Pennsylvania
- Coordinates: 40°26′15″N 79°59′51″W
- Construction started: 1927
- Completed: 1929
- Cost: $5.5 million ($103.1 million today)

Height
- Roof: 147.8 metres (485 ft)

Technical details
- Floor count: 40; 5 below ground
- Floor area: 400,000 square feet (37,161 m^{2})
- Lifts/elevators: 12

Design and construction
- Architects: Henry Hornbostel; Eric Fisher Wood
- Developer: W. J. Strassburger
- Main contractor: Dwight P. Robinson & Company

The Grant Building is 40-story, 147.8 m (485 ft) skyscraper at 310 Grant Street in downtown Pittsburgh, Pennsylvania. The building was completed and opened on February 1, 1929 at a cost of $5.5 million ($103.1 million today). The Art Deco building's facade is built with Belgian granite, limestone, and brick. It was famous for a radio antenna that rose roughly 100–150 feet (30–46 m) from the roof of the tower and had an aviation beacon that spelled out .--. .. - - ... -... ..- .-. --. .... or P-I-T-T-S-B-U-R-G-H in Morse Code. The beacon could be seen as far away as 150 miles (240 km) on clear nights. A smaller version of the beacon, still flashing out the name of the city remains to this day, although malfunctions with the relay switch caused it to spell "P-I-T-E-T-S-B-K-R-R-H", and eventually "T-P-E-B-T-S-A-U-R-G-H" before being repaired on July 27, 2009.

The tower on the roof also served as the broadcast antenna for radio station KDKA Pittsburgh which made the first commercially licensed radio broadcast on election night of 1920. At 10:45 PM on its 14th birthday (November 2, 1934), the radio station inaugurated new studios on the Grant Building's third floor.

Huntington National Bank, which operates a branch inside the tower, owns the signage rights, giving them two signs in the Pittsburgh skyline alongside Centre City Tower where Huntington has their Western Pennsylvania headquarters.

== Gallery ==
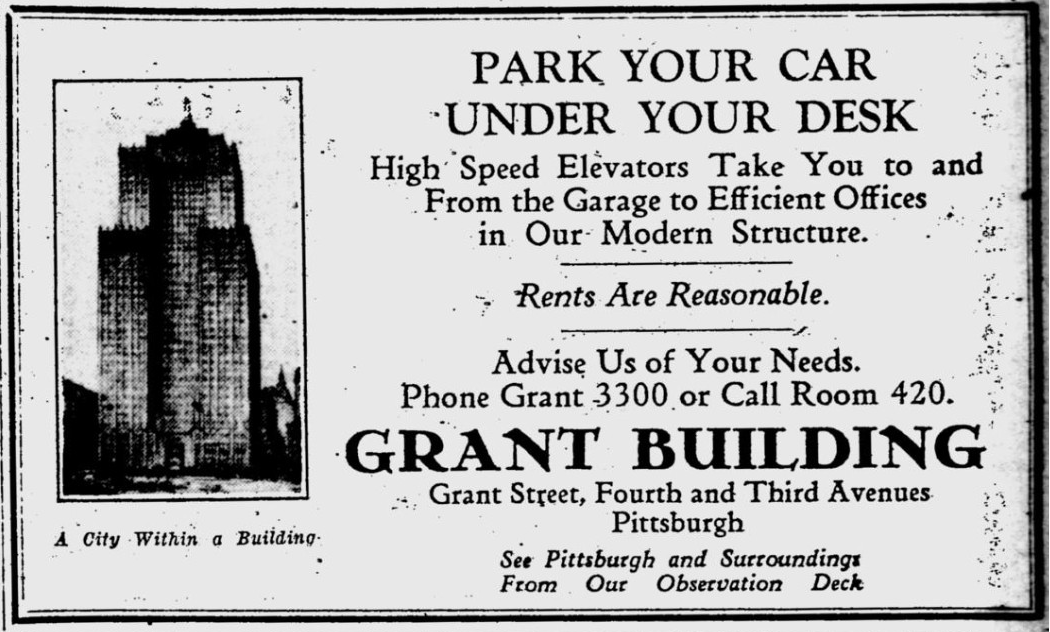
Grant Building advertisement from 1930

== See also ==
- List of tallest buildings in Pittsburgh
- List of state and county courthouses in Pennsylvania

Preceded by Koppers Tower	Pittsburgh Skyscrapers by Height; 485 feet (148 m)	Succeeded by K&L Gates Center
Preceded by Bell Telephone Building	Pittsburgh Skyscrapers by Year of Completion; 1929	Succeeded by Koppers Tower
