= City View =

City View can mean:

- City View, Ottawa, a neighbourhood in Ottawa
- City View, South Carolina, a town in South Carolina
- City View (Pittsburgh), a building in Pittsburgh, Pennsylvania

== See also ==
- Spring Hill–City View, a neighborhood in Pittsburgh, Pennsylvania
