= EQT =

EQT may refer to:

- EQT AB, a Swedish global private equity group, including infrastructure and real estate
  - EQT Ventures, the venture capital arm of EQT
- EQT Corporation, an American petroleum and natural gas company
- EQT Plaza, a skyscraper in Pittsburgh
- Mercedes-Benz EQT, an electric van
