= Oliver Building (Pittsburgh) =

Skyscraper in Pittsburgh

Henry W. Oliver Building
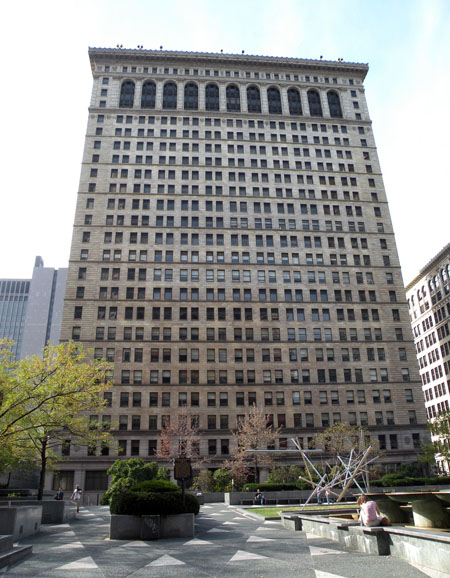
- Interactive map of the Henry W. Oliver Building area

General information
- Type: Commercial offices, Hotel
- Location: 535 Smithfield Street; Pittsburgh, Pennsylvania
- Coordinates: 40.4411°N 79.9981°W
- Construction started: 1908
- Completed: April 1, 1910
- Cost: US$3.5 million ($125.4 million today)

Height
- Roof: 105.77 m (347.0 ft)

Technical details
- Floor count: 25 (2 basements, 1 mechanical)
- Floor area: 338,359 sq ft (31,434.6 m^{2})
- Lifts/elevators: 17

Design and construction
- Architect: D. H. Burnham & Company
- Developer: Estate of Henry W. Oliver

Pittsburgh Landmark – PHLF
- Designated: 1974

The Henry W. Oliver Building, now known as the Embassy Suites By Hilton Pittsburgh Downtown, is a 25-story, 106 m (348 ft) skyscraper at 535 Smithfield Street, across from Mellon Square in Pittsburgh, Pennsylvania. The building was designed by Daniel Burnham and built in 1908–1910, consisting of a stone and terra cotta facade over a steel frame. It cost $3.5 million ($125.4 million today).

== History ==
The structure was completed as per the parameters of its namesake's will. Oliver planned that the building both serve as a way to consolidate the management of his steel and coal operations, and as a way to leave a mark on the city's growing skyline. Oliver's location for the structure was once the original founding home of Mellon Financial from its start in 1869 until 1871 when the bank moved across the street and down a block. For many years, the primary tenants in the building were international law firm K&L Gates, but in 2007, they moved to the larger Ariba Building, which became known as K&L Gates Center. Since their departure, the building was only about 40% occupied for a number of years.

== Embassy Suites ==
In late 2013 the floors 15-25 of the building were under conversion for a 228 room Embassy Suites Hotel to open in late 2015. Designed by ThenDesign Architecture, the decor of the hotel will pay homage to Oliver and the Industrial Age. Combined with a new multi-floor lease to a law firm the building is now over 90% occupied.

== See also ==
- List of tallest buildings in Pittsburgh

Preceded by Three Gateway Center	Pittsburgh Skyscrapers by Height; 347 feet (106 m); 25 floors	Succeeded by 11 Stanwix Street
Preceded by Commonwealth Building	Pittsburgh Skyscrapers by Year of Completion; 1910	Succeeded by Bell Telephone Building
