= City View (Pittsburgh) =

Apartment block in Pittsburgh

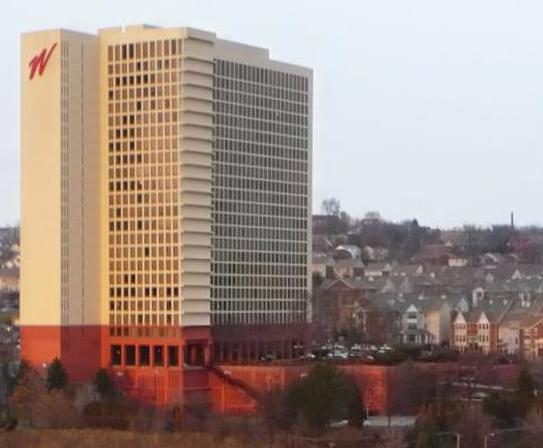
- Interactive map of the City View area

General information
- Type: Residential
- Location: 1420 Centre Avenue, Pittsburgh, United States
- Coordinates: 40°26′26″N 79°59′11″W
- Construction started: 1958
- Completed: 1964
- Owner: Faros
- Operator: Faros

Height
- Height: 300 ft (91 m)
- Top floor: 22

Technical details
- Floor count: 26
- Lifts/elevators: 4

Design and construction
- Architect: I. M. Pei

City View is a 300 ft (91m) residential highrise in Pittsburgh, Pennsylvania. It was completed in 1964 and has 26 floors. It is tied with the Commonwealth Building and The Carlyle for the 26th tallest building in Pittsburgh. It was designed by I.M. Pei. From its inception in 1964 until 2014 it was known as Washington Plaza.

== See also ==
- List of tallest buildings in Pittsburgh

Preceded by Commonwealth Building	Pittsburgh Skyscrapers by Height; 300 feet (91 m); 24 floors	Succeeded by Four Gateway Center
Preceded by Federal Building	Pittsburgh Skyscrapers by Year of Completion; 1964	Succeeded by K&L Gates Center
