= Federated Hermes Tower =

Skyscraper in Pittsburgh, Pennsylvania

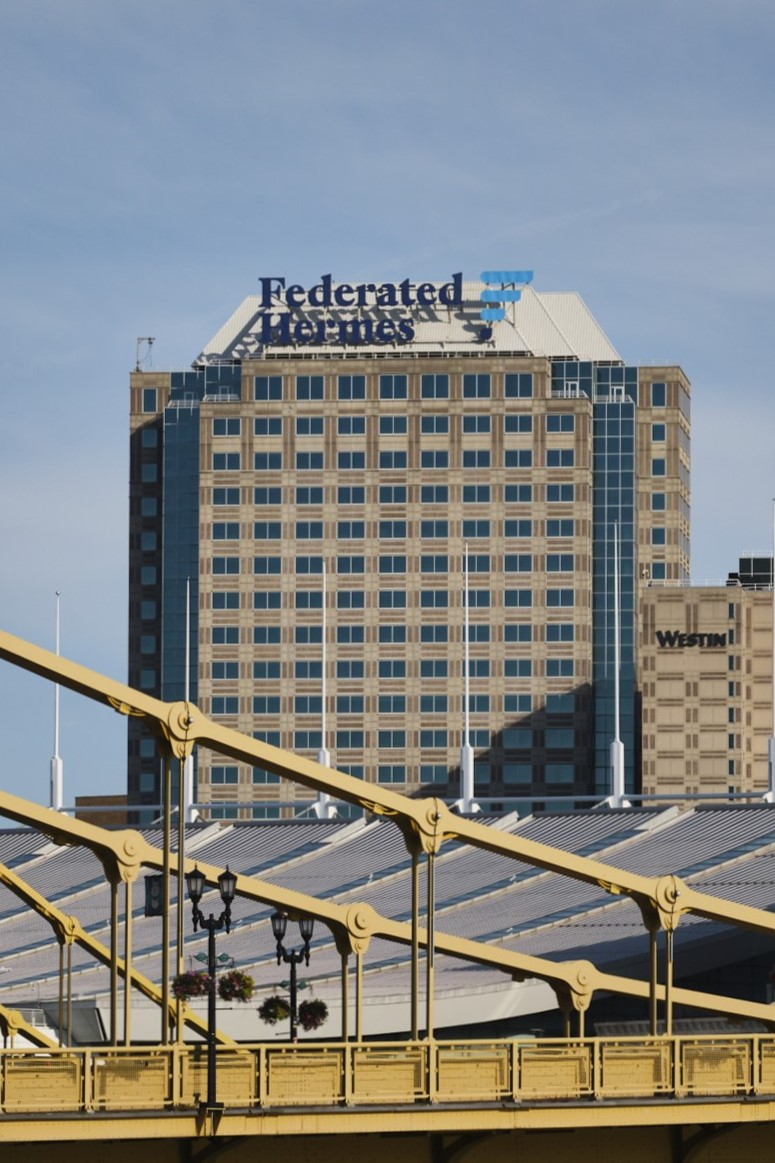
- Federated Hermes Tower, rising above the David L. Lawrence Convention Center
- Interactive map of the Federated Hermes Tower area

General information
- Type: Office
- Location: 1001 Liberty Avenue
- Coordinates: 40°26′40″N 79°59′39″W
- Construction started: 1985
- Completed: 1986
- Owner: CBRE Global Investors
- Operator: CBRE Group

Height
- Roof: 358 ft (109 m)

Technical details
- Floor count: 27
- Floor area: 530,000

Design and construction
- Developer: Liberty Center Ventures

Federated Hermes Tower is a 358-foot-tall (109 m) skyscraper in Pittsburgh, Pennsylvania. The building is part of Liberty Center, a two-building complex which also includes the Westin Convention Center Hotel. It was completed in 1986 and has 27 floors and 530,000 square feet (49,000 m^{2}) of space. It is the 16th tallest building in the city and houses the corporate headquarters of Federated Hermes.

Liberty Center was developed and built by Liberty Center Ventures, a partnership of Forest City Enterprises and Jos. L. Muscarelle, Inc., and opened in December 1986. The $137 million mixed-use complex was the first major development following the Renaissance II burst of construction in downtown Pittsburgh. The entire Liberty Center complex opened in December 1986. The complex was financed from three sources: a $99 million loan from Metropolitan Life Insurance Company, $21 million from the Pittsburgh Urban Redevelopment Authority, and the remainder from Jos. L. Muscarelle, Inc. and Forest City Enterprises.

In August 2013 the tower was sold by Forest City to Starwood Capital Group for $135 million.

On February 18, 2014, the tower opened the newly relocated downtown post office on the lobby floor.

In January 2017, CBRE Global Investors purchased the Federated Tower for an estimated $98 million. The purchase did not include the adjacent Westin Convention Center Hotel, which was part of the 2013 by Starwood Capital Group.

== See also ==
- List of tallest buildings in Pittsburgh

Preceded by 11 Stanwix Street	Pittsburgh Skyscrapers by Height; 358 feet (109 m); 27 floors	Succeeded by Three PNC Plaza
Preceded by Two PNC Plaza	Pittsburgh Skyscrapers by Year of Completion; 1986	Succeeded by BNY Mellon Center
