= Fifth Avenue Place (Pittsburgh) =

Skyscraper in Pittsburgh, Pennsylvania

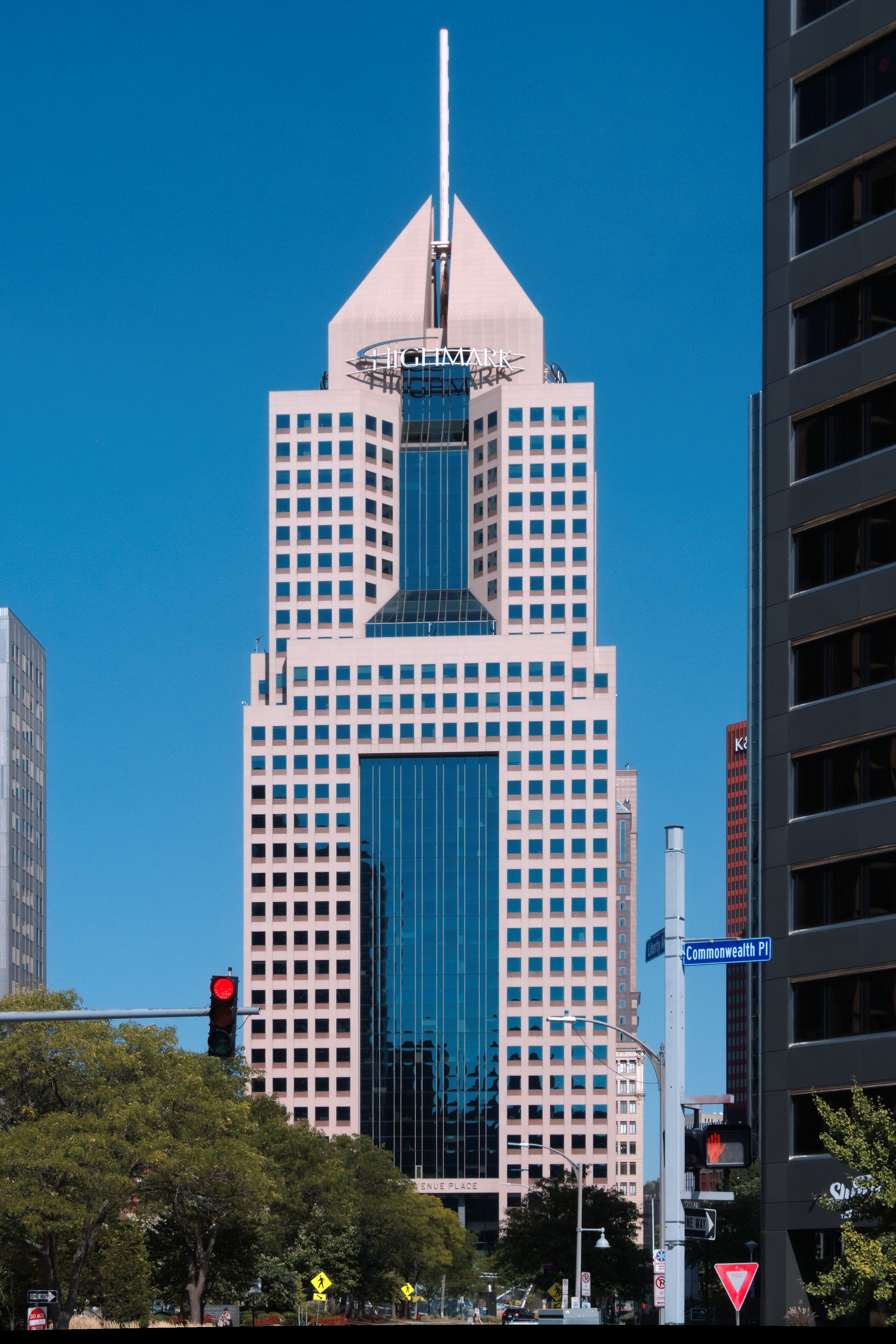
- Fifth Avenue Place from Liberty Avenue
- Interactive map of the Fifth Avenue Place area

General information
- Type: Office, retail
- Location: 120 Fifth Avenue, Pittsburgh
- Coordinates: 40°26′31″N 80°00′12″W
- Construction started: 1985
- Completed: 1988
- Cost: $100 million ($309.9 million today)

Height
- Roof: 616 ft (188 m)

Technical details
- Floor count: 31
- Floor area: 750,201 sq ft (69,696.0 m^{2})

Design and construction
- Architect: Stubbins Associates in association with WTW Architects
- Developer: Hillman Associates

Fifth Avenue Place (originally "Hillman Tower", sometimes called Highmark Place) is a skyscraper in Pittsburgh, Pennsylvania, United States. The building is owned by Highmark subsidiary Jenkins Empire Associates and has served as the company's headquarters since it was completed in 1988.

The building was completed on April 14, 1988 and it has 31 floors. Located at the corner of Liberty Avenue and Fifth Avenue, it rises 616 feet (188 m) above downtown Pittsburgh. The structure is made up of a unique granite frame for roughly the first 450 feet (140 m), then collapses inward in a pyramidal shape for another 124-foot-tall (38 m) roof structure. The roof utilizes four prisms clad in granite and encloses a penthouse area that stores the mechanics for the building as well as the cooling towers. Before Highmark's branding of the top of the tower, there were video screens at the base of the decorative summit of the building.

Protruding from the top of the skyscraper is a 178-foot-tall (54 m) mast manufactured by Meyer Industry of Minnesota. Despite its rounded appearance, the 13-story steel structure is actually 12-sided and measures four feet in diameter. Due to high winds, the mast allows for up to three feet of sway. The height at the top of the mast represents the intended height for the building when it was in development. However, the city decided that that height would not fit in well with the skyline, so the height of the main structure was restricted to what it is today.

Crane operator David Angle, the father of future Olympic wrestler and professional wrestler Kurt Angle, was killed in a construction accident during construction of Fifth Avenue Place on August 29, 1984.

== Retail ==
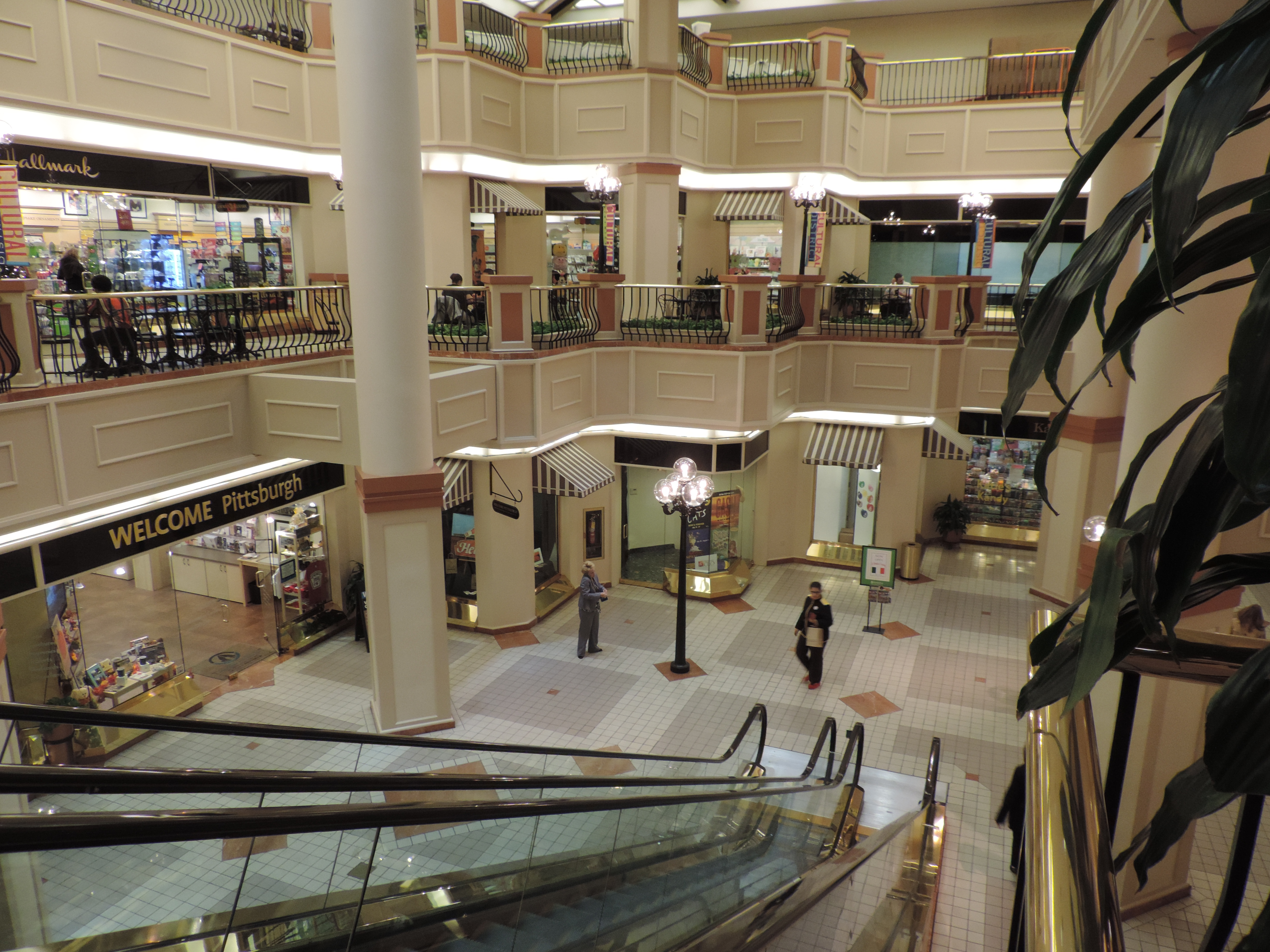
Commercial space on the first two floors.

There is a shopping center on the first two floors. A renovation of the space was announced in September 2019; the remodeled shopping mall will mainly focus on dining and is planned to include an open atrium and more natural lighting, plus other amenities. The renovation was expected to take three years to complete. The renovation was completed in May 2023 (new article section and pictures will need to be added.)

== See also ==
- List of tallest buildings in Pittsburgh
- Pittsburgh

Preceded by Oxford Centre	Pittsburgh Skyscrapers by Height; 616 feet (188 m); 31 floors	Succeeded by PPG Place
Preceded by EQT Plaza	Pittsburgh Skyscrapers by Year of Completion; 1988	Succeeded by Three PNC Plaza
