= Westin Convention Center Pittsburgh =

Building in Pittsburgh, Pennsylvania

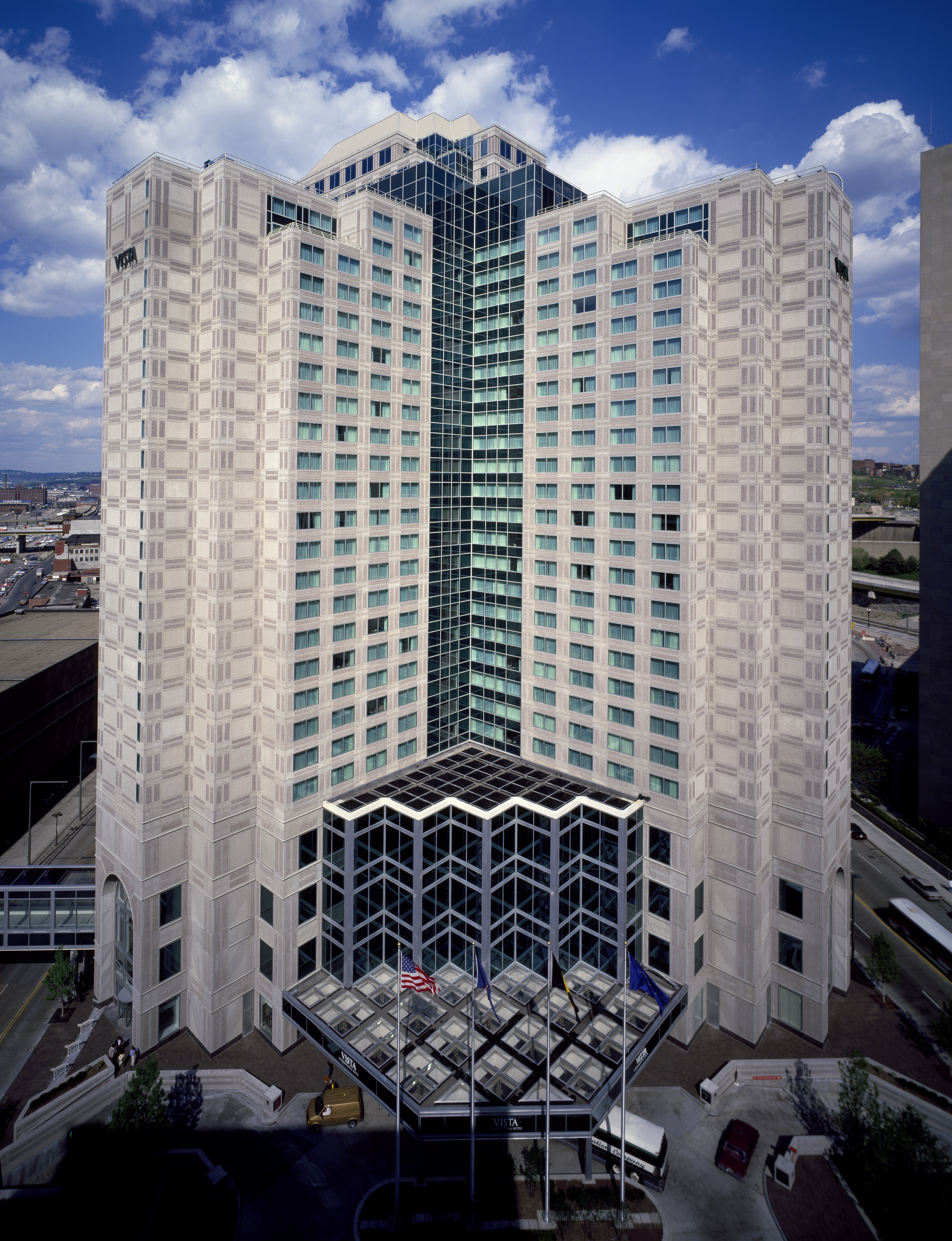
- Interactive map of the Westin Convention Center Pittsburgh area
- Hotel chain: Westin Hotels

General information
- Location: 1000 Penn Avenue, Pittsburgh, Pennsylvania 15222
- Coordinates: 40.4442°N 79.9949°W
- Opening: 1986
- Owner: Starwood Capital Group
- Operator: Westin Hotels

Height
- Height: 324 feet (99 m)

Technical details
- Floor count: 26

Design and construction
- Developer: Liberty Center Ventures

Other information
- Number of rooms: 616
- Number of restaurants: 1
- Parking: 600

The Westin Convention Center Pittsburgh is a 26-story hotel in Downtown Pittsburgh, with a prominent position in the area adjacent to the David L. Lawrence Convention Center and the Cultural District. The hotel is connected via an enclosed walkway to the convention center. The building is part of Liberty Center, a two building complex which also includes the Federated Tower. Liberty Center was developed and built by Liberty Center Ventures, a partnership of Forest City Enterprises and Jos. L. Muscarelle, Inc. and opened in December 1986. In August 2013, Liberty Center was sold by Forest City to Starwood Capital Group for $135 million.

== History ==
Liberty Center was developed and built by Liberty Center Ventures, a partnership of Forest City Enterprises and Jos. L. Muscarelle, Inc. and opened in December 1986. The $137 million mixed-use complex was the first major development following the Renaissance II burst of construction in downtown Pittsburgh. The hotel broke ground on December 6, 1984, construction "topped off" on September 26, 1985, and the entire Liberty Center complex opened in December 1986. The complex was financed from three sources: a $99 million loan from Metropolitan Life Insurance Company, a $21 million from the Urban Redevelopment Authority of Pittsburgh, and the remainder from Jos. L. Muscarelle, Inc. and Forest City Enterprises.

The hotel opened as the Vista International and was managed by Hilton International. From 1995 to 2001, the hotel was managed by DT Management Inc., a subsidiary of Hilton Hotel Corporation and was known as the DoubleTree Pittsburgh Hotel at Liberty Center. In 2001, Starwood took over management of the hotel, rebranding it as The Westin Convention Center.

In the 1980s it hosted the annual regional ad agency awards & banquet.

== Notable guests ==
Several notable figures have chosen the hotel:

- September 25–28, 1988: Michael Jackson stays at this hotel in a penthouse suite during his Bad World Tour and even requested a professional wooden dance floor to be installed for dance practice.
- December 6, 1991: South African leader Nelson Mandela visits the hotel for a major speech.
- January, 1992: Joan Collins while touring with the Private Lives stage show.
- March (early) 1992: Jack Nicholson and Danny DeVito while filming Hoffa (film)
- March 25, 1992: Then governor and presidential candidate Bill Clinton visits the convention center hotel days before the commonwealth's primary as he fights back the recent Connecticut loss to Jerry Brown.
- December 2, 2003: President George W. Bush visits for a major speech.
- July 25, 2005: Vice President Dick Cheney visits for a major speech.

== Mascot ==
In 2016 as part of a partnership with Anthrocon, the hotel was given an anthropomorphic mascot named "Westie", a West Highland White Terrier.
