= 11 Stanwix Street =

Skyscraper in Pittsburgh

Coordinates: 40°26′21″N 80°00′23″W

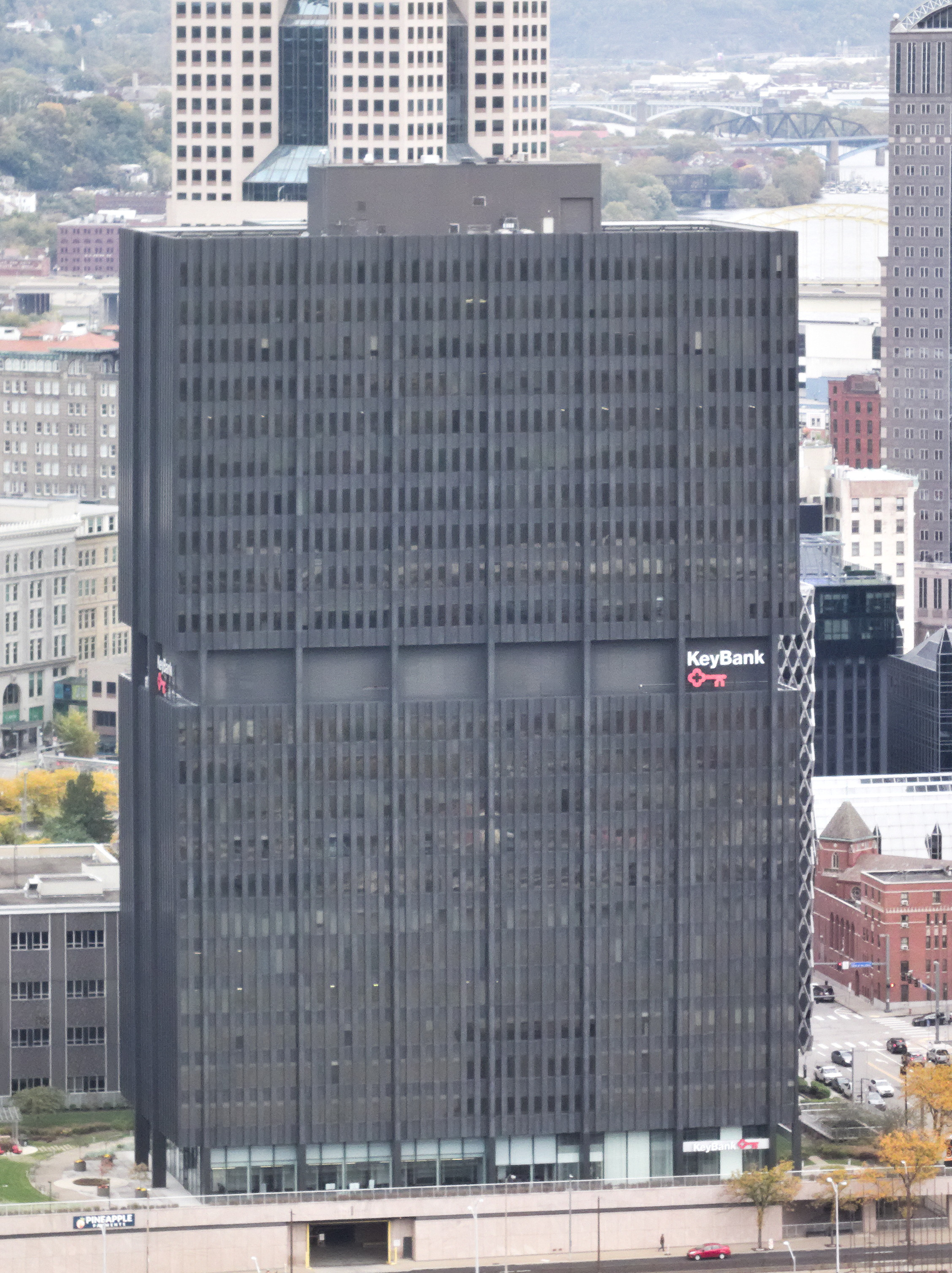
- View of 11 Stanwix Street building from Mount Washington
- Interactive map of the 11 Stanwix Street area

General information
- Status: Completed
- Type: Office
- Location: 11 Stanwix Street, Pittsburgh, Pennsylvania
- Completed: November 24, 1969
- Cost: $20 million ($175.6 million today)

Height
- Roof: 355 ft (108 m)

Technical details
- Floor count: 23
- Floor area: 738,000 sq ft (68,600 m^{2})

Design and construction
- Architect: Harrison & Abramovitz

Other information
- Parking: 500
- Westinghouse Electric Corporation Headquarters
- U.S. Historic district – Contributing property
- Part of: Pittsburgh Renaissance Historic District (ID13000252)
- Designated CP: May 2, 2013

11 Stanwix Street, formerly known as the Westinghouse Tower, is one of the major distinctive and recognizable features of Downtown Pittsburgh, Pennsylvania in the United States.

== History and architectural features ==
11 Stanwix Street was completed on November 24, 1969, with twenty-three floors. It was originally built and named for the Westinghouse Corporation; in 1999, that company went through a restructuring and moved its headquarters to its longtime research park in the suburb of Monroeville, before expansions in their operations necessitated a move to a larger suburban complex in Cranberry Township.

This tower rises 355 feet (108 meters) above Downtown Pittsburgh and is located near the Monongahela River. A ten-story building that once served as the city's main post was previously located on this site.

During this building's early years, one of the tenants was Federal Home Loan Bank (FHLB) of Pittsburgh, which occupied the third and fourth floors. FHLB later moved to the National Steel Building on Stanwix Street, finally making its permanent home in the Porter Building on Grant Street, now renamed for FHLB. As of June 2009, the building tenants were IBM, the Allegheny Conference on Community Development, Carmeuse North America, the advertising firm Brunner, and the local headquarters of KeyCorp.

== Gallery ==
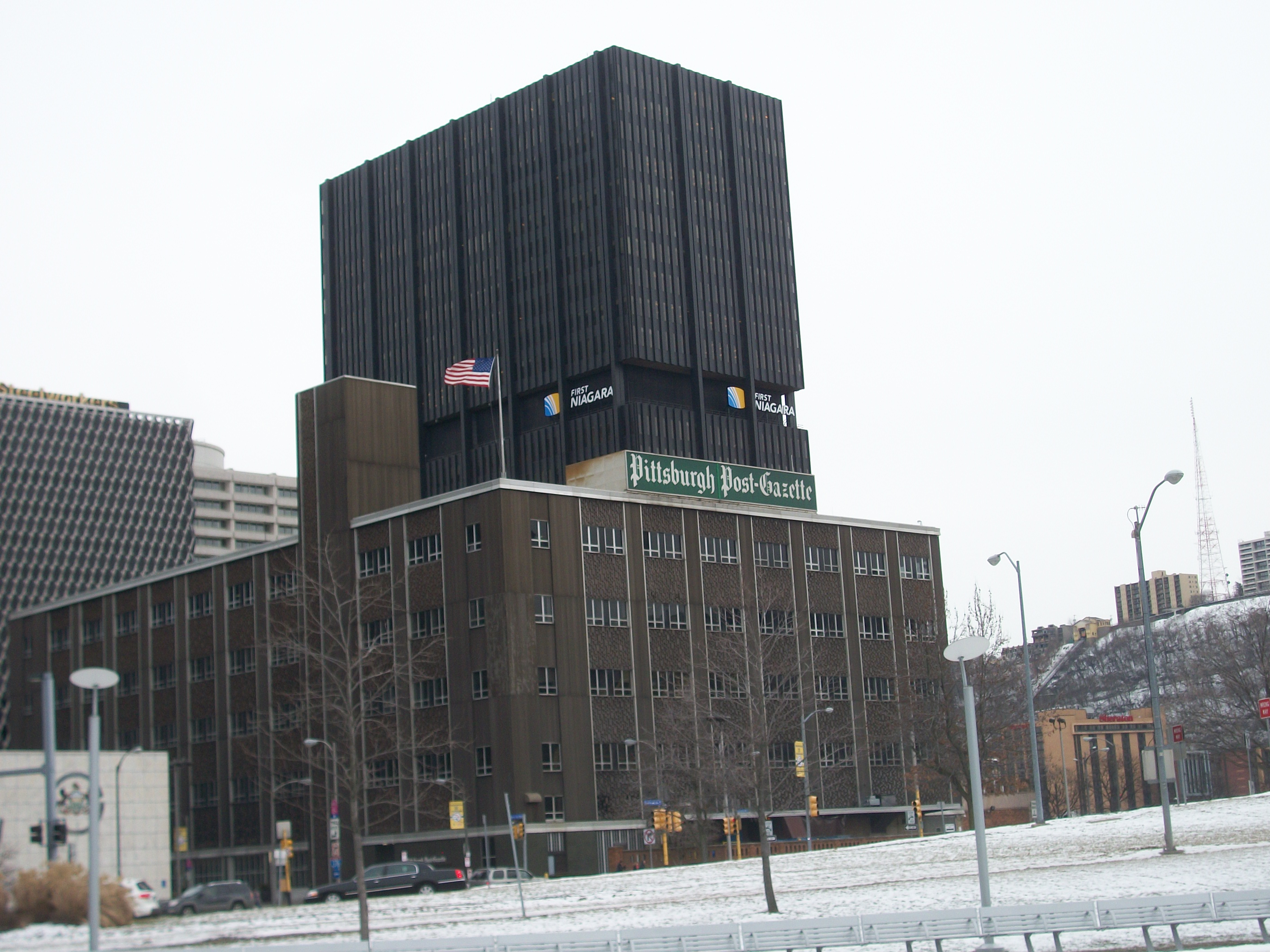
View from Point State Park showing First Niagara signage

== See also ==
- List of tallest buildings in Pittsburgh

Preceded by Oliver Building	Pittsburgh Skyscrapers by Height; 355 feet (108 m); 23 floors	Succeeded by Federated Tower
Preceded by K&L Gates Center	Pittsburgh Skyscrapers by Year of Completion; 1969	Succeeded by U.S. Steel Tower
