= Bell Telephone Building (Pittsburgh) =

Art deco skyscraper in Downtown Pittsburgh, Pennsylvania

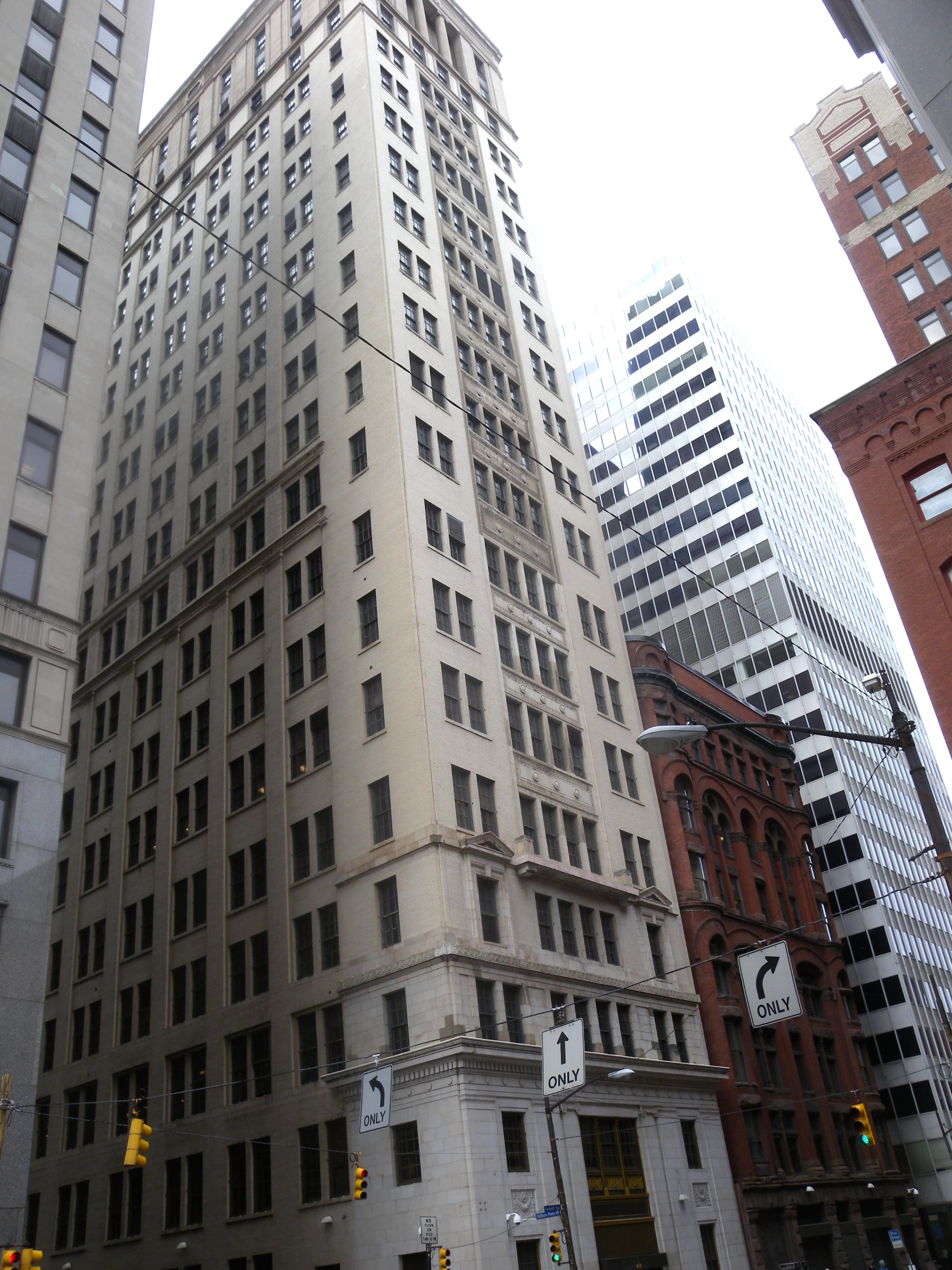
- Interactive map of the Bell Telephone Building area

General information
- Type: Office
- Location: 416 Seventh Avenue
- Coordinates: 40°26′32″N 79°59′47″W
- Completed: 1923

Height
- Roof: 339 ft (103 m)

Technical details
- Floor count: 20

The Bell Telephone Building is a 339-foot (103 m) art deco skyscraper in Downtown Pittsburgh, Pennsylvania, United States. It was completed in 1923 and has 20 floors. It is the 22nd-tallest building in the city.

== See also ==
- List of tallest buildings in Pittsburgh

Preceded by Wyndham Grand Pittsburgh Downtown	Pittsburgh Skyscrapers by Height; 339 feet (103 m); 20 floors	Succeeded by William S. Moorhead Federal Building
Preceded by Oliver Building	Pittsburgh Skyscrapers by Year of Completion; 1923	Succeeded by Koppers Tower
