= List of tallest buildings in Pittsburgh =

Skyline of Pittsburgh
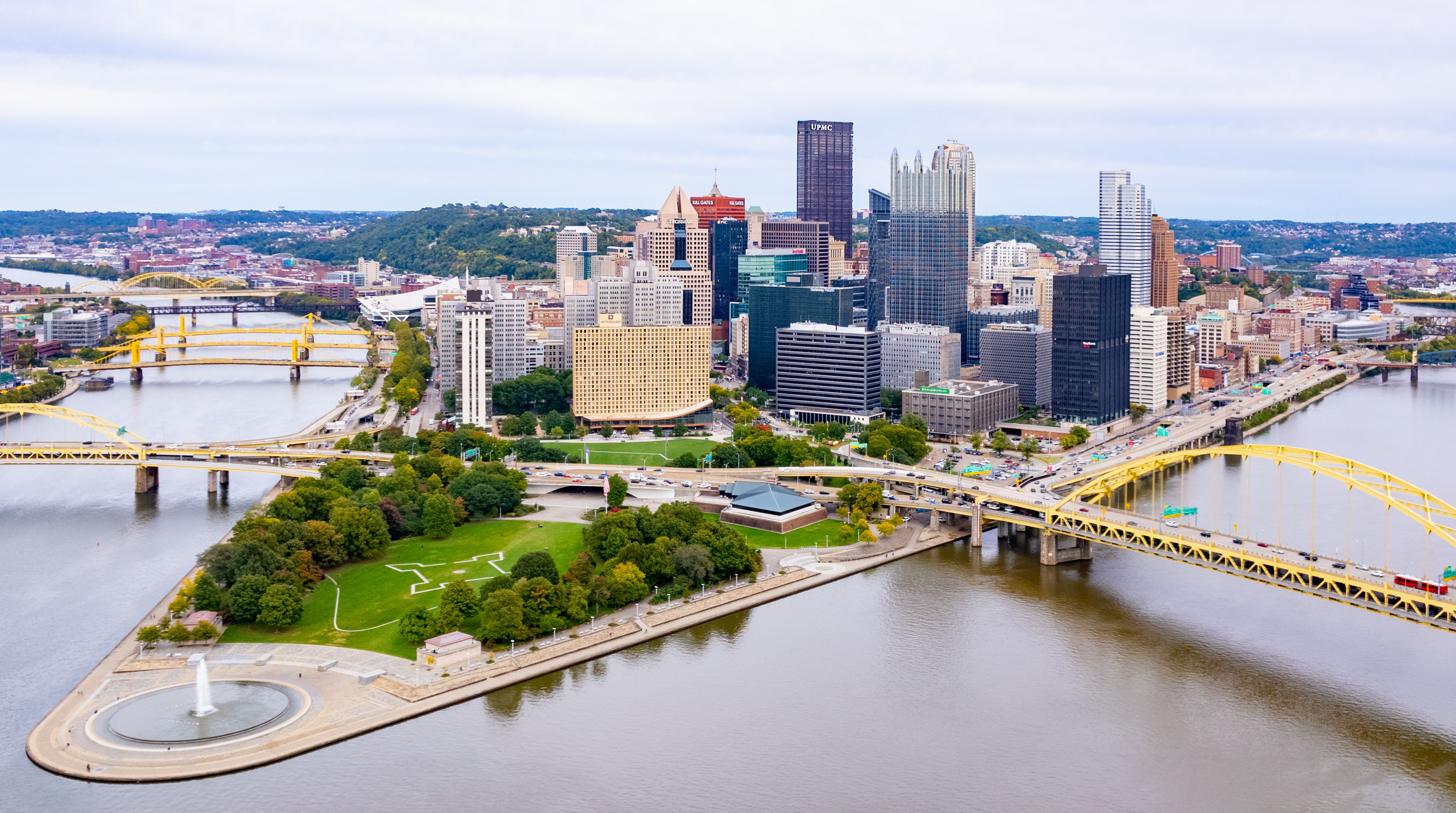
- Downtown Pittsburgh in 2022
- Tallest building: U.S. Steel Tower (1970)
- Tallest building height: 841 ft (256 m)
- First 150 m+ building: Gulf Tower (1932)

Number of tall buildings (2026)
- Taller than 100 m (328 ft): 27
- Taller than 150 m (492 ft): 10
- Taller than 200 m (656 ft): 2

Number of tall buildings — feet
- Taller than 300 ft (91.4 m): 34

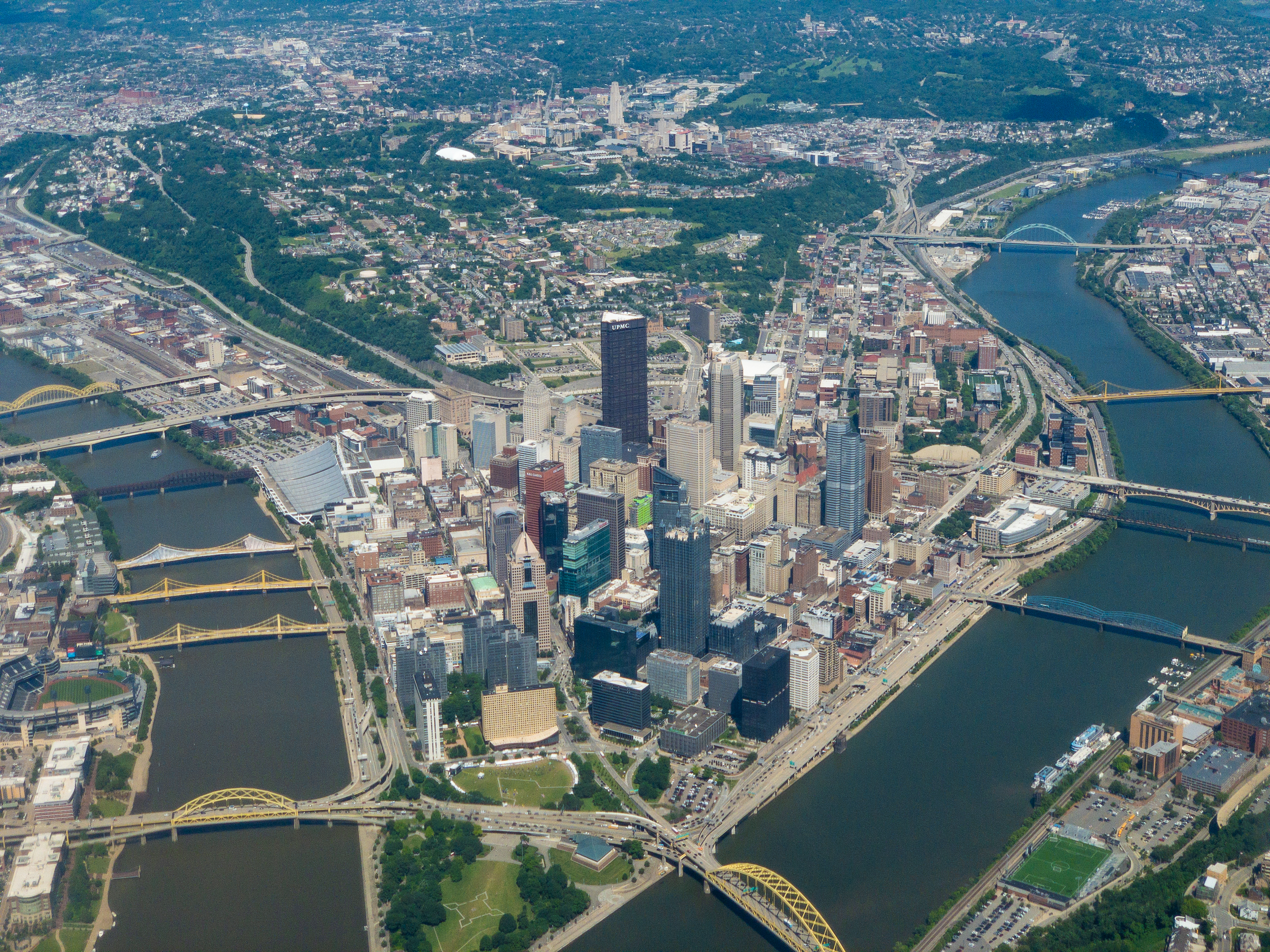
An aerial view of Pittsurgh's skyline in 2020, looking east

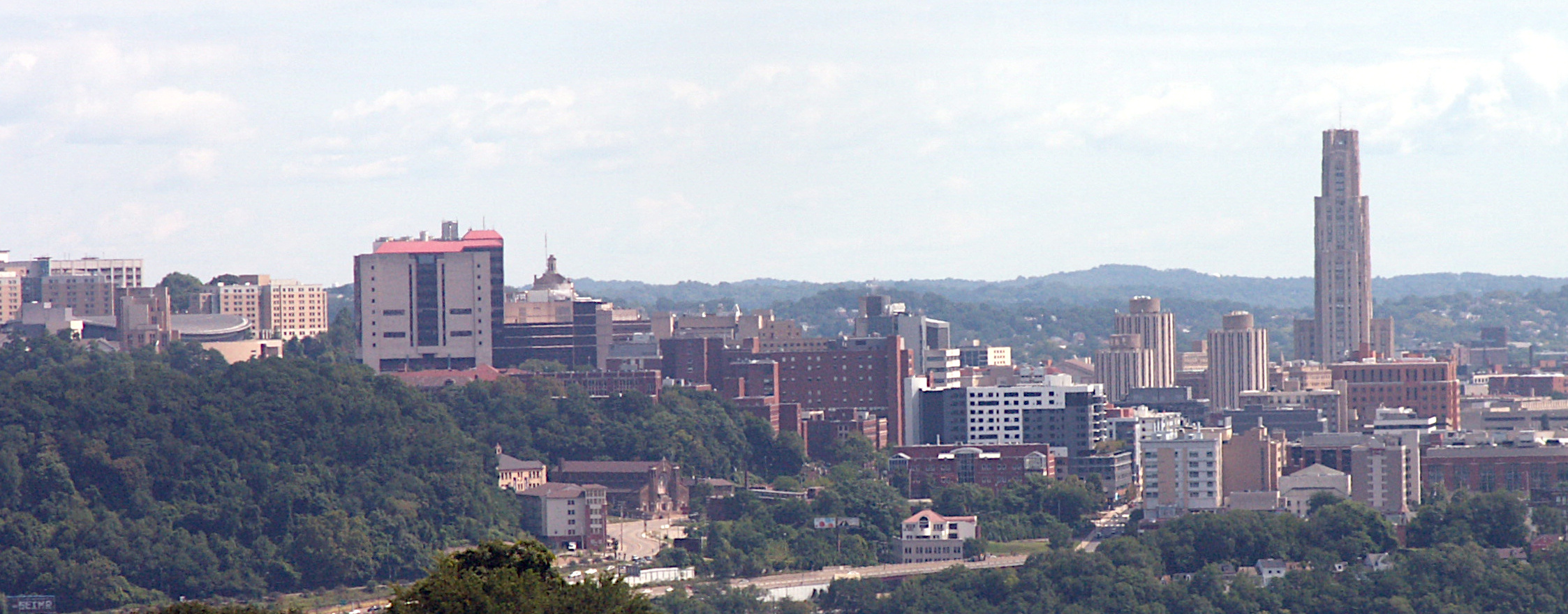
The skyline of Oakland, dominated by the Cathedral of Learning

Pittsburgh is the second-largest city in the U.S. state of Pennsylvania, with a metropolitan area population of over 2.3 million as of 2025. With over 125 high-rise buildings with a height of at least 115 feet (35 m), 34 of which exceed 300 ft (91 m), Pittsburgh's skyline is the second-largest in Pennsylvania, after Philadelphia. The tallest building in Pittsburgh is the 64-story U.S. Steel Tower, which rises 841 feet (256 m) and was completed in 1970. It was built as the headquarters of U.S Steel, reflecting Pittsburgh's role in the steel industry, and is the fifth tallest building in Pennsylvania. Pittsburgh and Philadelphia make up the vast majority of high-rises in Pennsylvania.

The majority of high-rises in Pittsburgh are located in the city's downtown, forming a compact, triangular-shaped skyline bound to the north by the Allegheny River, to the south by the Monongahela River, and to the east by Interstate 579. Pittsburgh's numerous bridges that traverse the two rivers are a common cityscape feature, and are often pictured alongside its skyscrapers. Mount Washington is a popular photography spot of the downtown skyline. Less than three miles east of downtown is Oakland, containing the city's second major concentration of high-rises, many of which are part of the University of Pittsburgh. By far the tallest building in Oakland is the 535 ft (161 m) tall Cathedral of Learning, a Gothic Revival skyscraper that is Pittsburgh's eighth-tallest building and one of the university's main buildings.

From the early 1930s to the 1970s, Pittsburgh had one of the tallest skylines in the world. The history of skyscrapers in Pittsburgh began with the 1895 completion of the Carnegie Building; this structure, rising 13 floors, was the first steel-framed skyscraper to be constructed in the city. It never held the title of tallest structure in Pittsburgh, however, as it did not surpass the 249-foot (76 m) tower of the Allegheny County Courthouse. Pittsburgh was the site of considerable pre-war skyscraper development in the United States, including early landmarks such as the Grant Building and the Gulf Tower. 14 high-rises over 300 ft (91 m) where built before 1940, making up about a third of all buildings above that height in the city. After a lull in construction from the mid-1930s to the late 1940s, skyscraper construction resumed in the 1950s. Pittsburgh experienced a large building boom from the late 1960s to the mid-1980s. During this time, 11 of the city's 20 tallest buildings were constructed, including the city's three tallest structures: the U.S. Steel Tower, BNY Mellon Center, and PPG Place, which is notable for its glass spires.

Unlike many other major American cities, relatively few high-rises have been built in Pittsburgh during the 21st century, as the population of the city and Greater Pittsburgh continued to decline from its peak in the mid-20th century. Only three skyscrapers over 300 ft (91 m) have been completed since 2000: Three PNC Plaza in 2009, Tower at PNC Plaza in 2015, and the FNB Financial Center in 2024. At 545 feet (166 m), Tower at PNC Plaza, distinguished by its slanted roof, is the tallest building completed in Pittsburgh in the 21st century, while the FNB Financial Center is the tallest building in the Hill District.

== History ==
Number of buildings by height in Pittsburgh by the end of each year, taking into account demolished buildings. Click on the legend to toggle a specific height on or off. View chart definition.

== Cityscape ==
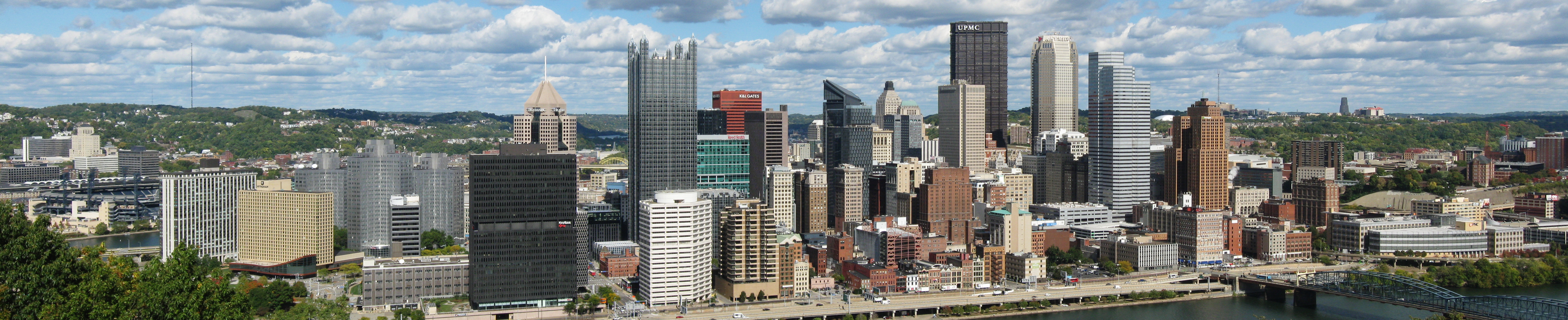
Downtown Pittsburgh from Mount Washington in 2020. The Cathedral of Learning in Oakland is visible on the far right.

== Map of tallest buildings ==
The map below shows the location of buildings taller than 300 feet (91 m) in downtown Pittsburgh. Each marker is numbered by the building's height rank, and colored by the decade of its completion. There is only one building in Pittsburgh taller than 300 feet (91 m) that is located outside of the map, the Cathedral of Learning in Oakland.

Buildings taller than 300 ft (91 m) in Downtown Pittsburgh. An asterisk (*) next to the building's name indicates it is located outside the map.
- 1950s and before
- 1960s
- 1970s
- 1980s
- 1990s
- 2000s
- 2010s
- 2020s
1 U.S. Steel Tower
2 BNY Mellon Center
3 One PPG Place
4 Fifth Avenue Place
5 One Oxford Centre
6 Gulf Tower
7 Tower at PNC Plaza
8 Cathedral of Learning*
9 525 William Penn Place
10 K&L Gates Center
11 Grant Building
12 Koppers Tower
13 Two PNC Plaza
14 EQT Plaza
15 One PNC Plaza
16 FNB Financial Center
17 Regional Enterprise Tower
18 Federated Hermes Tower
19 11 Stanwix Street
20 Oliver Building
21 Three PNC Plaza
22 Three Gateway Center
23 Centre City Tower
24 William S. Moorhead Federal Building
25 Bell Telephone Building
26 AT&T Building
27 Frick Building
28 Midtown Towers
29 Omni William Penn Hotel
30 Four Gateway Center
31 Clark Building
32 Commonwealth Building
33 The Carlyle
34 City View

== Tallest buildings ==
This list ranks completed buildings in Pittsburgh that stand at least 300 ft (91 m) tall as of 2026, based on standard height measurement. This includes spires and architectural details but does not include antenna masts. The “Year” column indicates the year of completion. Buildings tied in height are sorted by year of completion with earlier buildings ranked first, and then alphabetically.

Was the tallest building in Pittsburgh upon completion

Rank	Name	Image	Location	Height ft (m)	Floors	Year	Purpose	Notes
1	U.S. Steel Tower		40°26′29″N 79°59′41″W	841 (256.3)	64	1970	Office	77th-tallest building in the United States, 5th tallest in Pennsylvania. Has been the tallest building in the city since 1970, and was the tallest building in the state from 1970 until the 1987 completion of One Liberty Place in Philadelphia. Tallest building constructed in Pittsburgh in the 1970s and in the 20th century. Known as the USX Tower between 1986 and 2000. Corporate headquarters of U.S. Steel and UPMC.
2	BNY Mellon Center	A tall beige building with the word "Mellon" in glowing green letters on the top.	40°26′23″N 79°59′46″W	725 (221)	54	1983	Office	Tallest building completed in Pittsburgh in the 1980s. Formerly known as One Mellon Center during its period as corporate headquarters of Mellon Financial. Bank of New York Mellon currently has its largest concentration of employees in the facility.
3	One PPG Place	an all glass building with no other tall buildings around it. It is topped off by a glass spire on each corner and is surrounded by much shorter but similarly Gothic glass buildings.	40°26′24″N 80°00′13″W	635 (193.6)	40	1984	Office	Corporate headquarters of PPG Industries and co-headquarters of Kraft Heinz.
4	Fifth Avenue Place		40°26′31″N 80°00′12″W	616 (187.8)	32	1987	Office	Corporate headquarters of Highmark.
5	One Oxford Centre		40°26′17″N 79°59′55″W	615 (187.5)	45	1983	Office	Originally corporate headquarters of Oxford Development, now a multi-tenanted building.
6	Gulf Tower		40°26′33″N 79°59′43″W	582 (177.4)	44	1932	Mixed-use	Tallest building completed in Pittsburgh in the 1930s. Tallest building in Pittsburgh from 1932 to 1970. The name references structure's status as former headquarters of Gulf Oil, although the site has functioned as a multi-tenant building since 1982. Now a mixed-use residential and hotel building.
7	Tower at PNC Plaza		40°26′25″N 80°00′01″W	545 (166)	33	2015	Office	Tallest building completed in Pittsburgh in the 2010s and in the 21st century. Part of PNC Financial Services corporate headquarters.
8	Cathedral of Learning		40°26′40″N 79°57′11″W	535 (163.1)	42	1936	Education	Second-tallest university building in the world, behind the main building of Moscow State University. Tallest building in the city located outside of Downtown. Landmark structure of the University of Pittsburgh.
9	525 William Penn Place		40°26′24″N 79°59′52″W	520 (158.5)	41	1951	Office	Tallest building constructed in Pittsburgh in the 1950s. Originally housed corporate headquarters of both U.S. Steel and Mellon Financial. Signage rights belong to largest tenant Citizens Financial Group.
10	K&L Gates Center		40°26′31″N 80°00′00″W	511 (155.8)	39	1968	Office	Tallest building constructed in Pittsburgh in the 1960s. Originally known as One Oliver Plaza and formerly named for lead tenants FreeMarkets and later Ariba. Corporate headquarters of K&L Gates.
11	Grant Building		40°26′16″N 79°59′51″W	485 (147.8)	40	1930	Office	Tallest building in Pittsburgh from 1930 to 1932. The building's signage rights belong to largest tenant Huntington Bancshares.
12	Koppers Tower		40°26′32″N 79°59′44″W	475 (144.8)	34	1929	Office	Briefly tallest building in Pittsburgh from 1929 to 1930. Tallest building completed in Pittsburgh in the 1920s. Corporate headquarters of Koppers.
13	Two PNC Plaza		40°26′30″N 80°00′03″W	445 (135.6)	34	1975	Office	Part of PNC Financial Services corporate headquarters.
14	EQT Plaza		40°26′33″N 80°00′03″W	430 (131.1)	32	1987	Office	Corporate headquarters of EQT Corporation. Formerly named for CNG and Dominion Energy before these entities were acquired via merger.
15	One PNC Plaza		40°26′28″N 80°00′02″W	424 (129.2)	30	1972	Office	Part of PNC Financial Services corporate headquarters.
16	FNB Financial Center		40°26′30″N 79°59′30″W	418 (127.4)	26	2024	Office	Tallest building completed in Pittsburgh in the 2020s. Corporate headquarters of FNB Corporation.
17	Regional Enterprise Tower		40°26′29″N 79°59′49″W	410 (125)	30	1953	Mixed-use	First skyscraper with an all-aluminum facade. Formerly the corporate headquarters of Alcoa before its relocation to a low-rise structure. Then known as the Regional Enterprises Tower during a period of multi-tenant occupancy. Now also known as The Residences at the Alcoa Building. Converted to the city's tallest residential structure in 2016.
18	Federated Hermes Tower		40°26′40″N 79°59′39″W	358 (109.1)	27	1986	Office	Corporate headquarters of Federated Investors.
19	11 Stanwix Street		40°26′20″N 80°00′23″W	355 (108.2)	23	1970	Office	Former corporate headquarters of Westinghouse Electric Corporation, and was then known as Westinghouse Tower. Signage rights owned by largest tenant KeyBank.
20	Oliver Building		40°26′28″N 79°59′53″W	347 (105.8)	25	1910	Mixed-use	Tallest existing building completed in Pittsburgh in the 1910s Tallest building in Pittsburgh from 1910 to 1912. In 2015, one-third of the structure's floor space was converted from office to hotel use.
21	Three PNC Plaza		40°26′29″N 80°00′05″W	344 (105)	23	2009	Mixed-use	Tallest building completed in Pittsburgh in the 2000s. Part of PNC Financial Services corporate headquarters. Signage rights owned by largest tenant Reed Smith. Mixed-use office, hotel, and residential building.
22	Three Gateway Center		40°26′31″N 80°00′20″W	344 (104.9)	24	1952	Office	
23	Centre City Tower		40°26′33″N 79°59′48″W	341 (103.9)	26	1971	Office	Signage rights owned by largest tenant Huntington Bancshares.
24	William S. Moorhead Federal Building		40°26′36″N 79°59′41″W	340 (103.6)	23	1964	Government	Tallest government building in Pittsburgh.
25	Bell Telephone Building		40°26′31″N 79°59′47″W	339 (103.3)	21	1931	Office	Also known as the Verizon Building.
26	AT&T Building	–	40°26′30″N 79°59′44″W	330 (100.7)	16	1969	Office	Also used for telecommunications.
27	Frick Building		40°26′21″N 79°59′51″W	330 (100.6)	20	1902	Office	Tallest existing building constructed in Pittsburgh in the 1900s.
28	Midtown Towers		40°26′33″N 80°00′01″W	305 (93)	18	1907	Residential	Also known as the Keenan Building.
29	Omni William Penn Hotel		40°26′26″N 79°59′48″W	305 (93)	26	1916	Hotel	
30	Four Gateway Center		40°26′27″N 80°00′17″W	305 (93)	22	1960	Office	
31	Clark Building		40°26′34″N 79°59′58″W	301 (91.8)	26	1928	Residential	
32	Commonwealth Building		40°26′21″N 80°00′03″W	300 (91.4)	21	1906	Residential	Originally an office building. Conversion to apartment building began October 2019.
33	The Carlyle		40°26′21″N 80°00′04″W	300 (91.4)	22	1906	Residential	Converted to condominiums in 2006. While serving as an office building, was named for Union National Bank and, later, its successor Integra Bank.
34	City View		40°26′25″N 79°59′12″W	300 (91.4)	24	1964	Residential	Apartment structure. Formerly known as Washington Plaza.

As of 2026, there are no buildings under construction that will be taller than 300 ft (91 m) in Pittsburgh, nor are there any proposed.

== Tallest demolished ==
Two buildings that stood at least 300 feet (91 m) have been demolished in Pittsburgh.

Name	Image	Height ft (m)	Floors	Year completed	Year destroyed	Notes
First National Bank Building		387 (118)	26	1912	1970	Tallest building in Pittsburgh from 1912 to 1929. Demolished to make room for One PNC Plaza.
Farmers Bank Building		344 (105)	25	1902	1997	Tallest building in Pittsburgh from 1902 to 1910. Demolished for the construction of a Lazarus department store due to a lack of tenants.

== Timeline of tallest buildings ==
Name	Image	Street address	Years as tallest	Height ft (m)	Floors	Reference
Trinity Episcopal Cathedral		328 Sixth Avenue	1872–1888	200 (61)	N/A	
Allegheny County Courthouse		436 Grant Street	1888–1902	249 (76)	5	
Farmers Bank Building		301 Fifth Avenue	1902–1910	344 (105)	25	Now demolished.
Oliver Building		535 Smithfield Street	1910–1912	347 (106)	25	
First National Bank Building		511 Wood Street at Fifth Avenue	1912–1929	387 (118)	26	Now demolished.
Koppers Tower		436 7th Avenue	1929–1930	475 (145)	34	
Grant Building		330 Grant Street	1930–1932	485 (148)	40	
Gulf Building		707 Grant Street	1932–1970	582 (177)	44	
U.S. Steel Tower		600 Grant Street	1970–present	841 (256)	64	

== See also ==
- Architecture of Pittsburgh
- List of tallest buildings in Camden
- List of tallest buildings in Harrisburg
- List of tallest buildings in Philadelphia
- List of tallest buildings in Reading, Pennsylvania
