= Farmers Bank Building (Pittsburgh) =

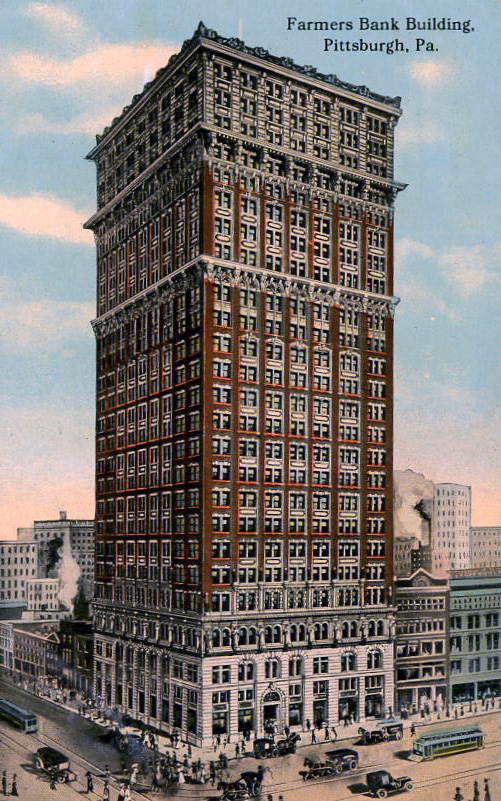
- Alternative names: Farmers Deposit National Bank Building; Rockwell-Standard Building; 500 Wood Street

General information
- Status: Imploded
- Type: Commercial offices
- Architectural style: Neoclassical
- Location: 305 Fifth Avenue; Pittsburgh, Pennsylvania
- Coordinates: 40.440750°N 80.000154°W
- Completed: 1902
- Renovated: 1967
- Demolished: May 25, 1997
- Owner: Penzer Inc.
- Operator: Penzer Inc.

Height
- Roof: 105.01 m (344.5 ft)

Technical details
- Floor count: 27

Design and construction
- Architects: Alden & Harlow

The Farmers Bank Building was a 27-story, 105 m (344 ft) skyscraper in Pittsburgh, Pennsylvania completed in 1902 and demolished on May 25, 1997. The University of Pittsburgh's online digital library states the building was constructed in 1903 and had 24 stories. To a generation of Pittsburgh sports fans the building is well remembered for being resurfaced in the mid 1960s in a failed rehabilitation but also fondly for a 15 story high mural of Roberto Clemente, Bill Mazeroski, Jack Lambert, Mean Joe Greene and Mario Lemieux completed in 1992 by Judy Penzer, who was killed in the crash of TWA Flight 800 four years later. For the five years the mural existed it was often the centerpiece for national networks cutting to or from games while they were in town for sporting events.

Rockwell International owned the building starting in the mid-1960s and used it as its global headquarters, selling it in early 1972 and consolidating its headquarters staff in the U.S. Steel Tower blocks away.

The building was imploded by Controlled Demolition, Inc. on the afternoon of May 25, 1997. In its place, a low-rise department store named Lazarus was built on the site. That building has since been extensively redesigned and now operates as a condominium development named Piatt Place.

== See also ==
- List of tallest buildings in Pittsburgh
