= EQT Plaza =

Major and distinctive skyscraper in Downtown Pittsburgh, Pennsylvania

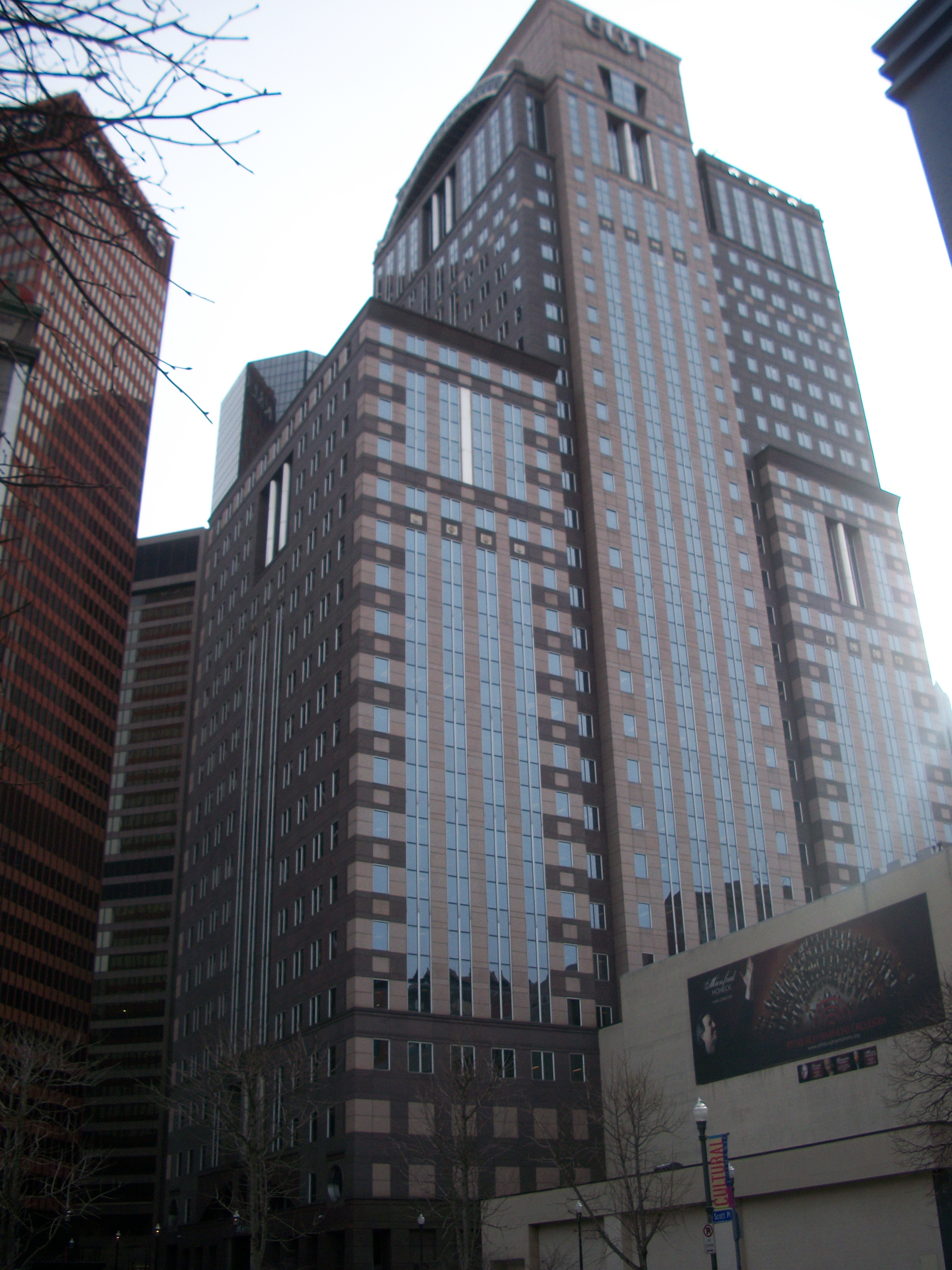
- Interactive map of the EQT Plaza area

General information
- Status: Completed
- Type: Office
- Location: 625 Liberty Avenue
- Coordinates: 40°26′33″N 80°00′04″W
- Construction started: January 9, 1984
- Completed: 1987
- Owner: Highwoods Properties
- Management: Highwoods Properties

Height
- Roof: 430 ft (131 m)

Technical details
- Floor count: 32
- Floor area: 16,000 sf (smaller floor plates), 23,000 sf (larger floor plates)
- Lifts/elevators: 14

EQT Plaza, formerly known as the CNG Tower and later the Dominion Tower, is a major and distinctive skyscraper in Downtown Pittsburgh, Pennsylvania. The structure was built for Consolidated Natural Gas, a regional energy company. In 1999, CNG was purchased by Dominion Energy, which moved out of the building in 2007. During the summer of 2009, EQT Corporation moved its corporate headquarters and several business units from the 6-story building EQT had built and moved into in 2005, just across the Allegheny River in the North Shore neighborhood of the city.

== History ==
The skyscraper was originally designed to be the global headquarters of Allegheny International-better known by its retail branding name of Sunbeam. At the time of construction Sunbeam was the world's largest maker of small appliances.

Allegheny International's Realty Development Corporation (AIRDC) secured a low-interest Urban Development Action loan from the URA for $8.5 million which the Cultural Trust collected payments on. The Public Auditorium Authority leased the land for the Benedum to AIRDC which then assigned the rights to the Cultural Trust while the Penn-Lincoln holding company retained ownership of the land but leased the property to AIRDC for 82 years and transferred lease payments to the Cultural Trust.

The 32 floor skyscraper was completed in 1987 at a cost of $100 million. It rises 430 feet (131 meters) above Downtown Pittsburgh. It was influenced heavily by the Art Deco architecture found in other Pittsburgh skyscrapers, like the Gulf Tower, Koppers Tower and Grant Building.

The building was owned between 2005 and 2010 by the Blackstone Group, a real estate firm well known for their management of high risk assets. After buying the structure following the bankruptcy of former owners, they successfully increased the building's occupancy rate from 66% to 97%. In 2010, Blackstone sold the building to Pearson Realty Services. In December 2012, the property was acquired by Highwoods Properties of Raleigh, North Carolina, who also owns the nearby landmark skyscraper PPG Place.

Preceded by One PNC Plaza	Pittsburgh Skyscrapers by Height; 430 feet (131 m); 32 floors	Succeeded by Two PNC Plaza
Preceded by PPG Place	Pittsburgh Skyscrapers by Year of Completion; 1987	Succeeded by Fifth Avenue Place
