= The Carlyle (Pittsburgh) =

Skyscraper in Pittsburgh

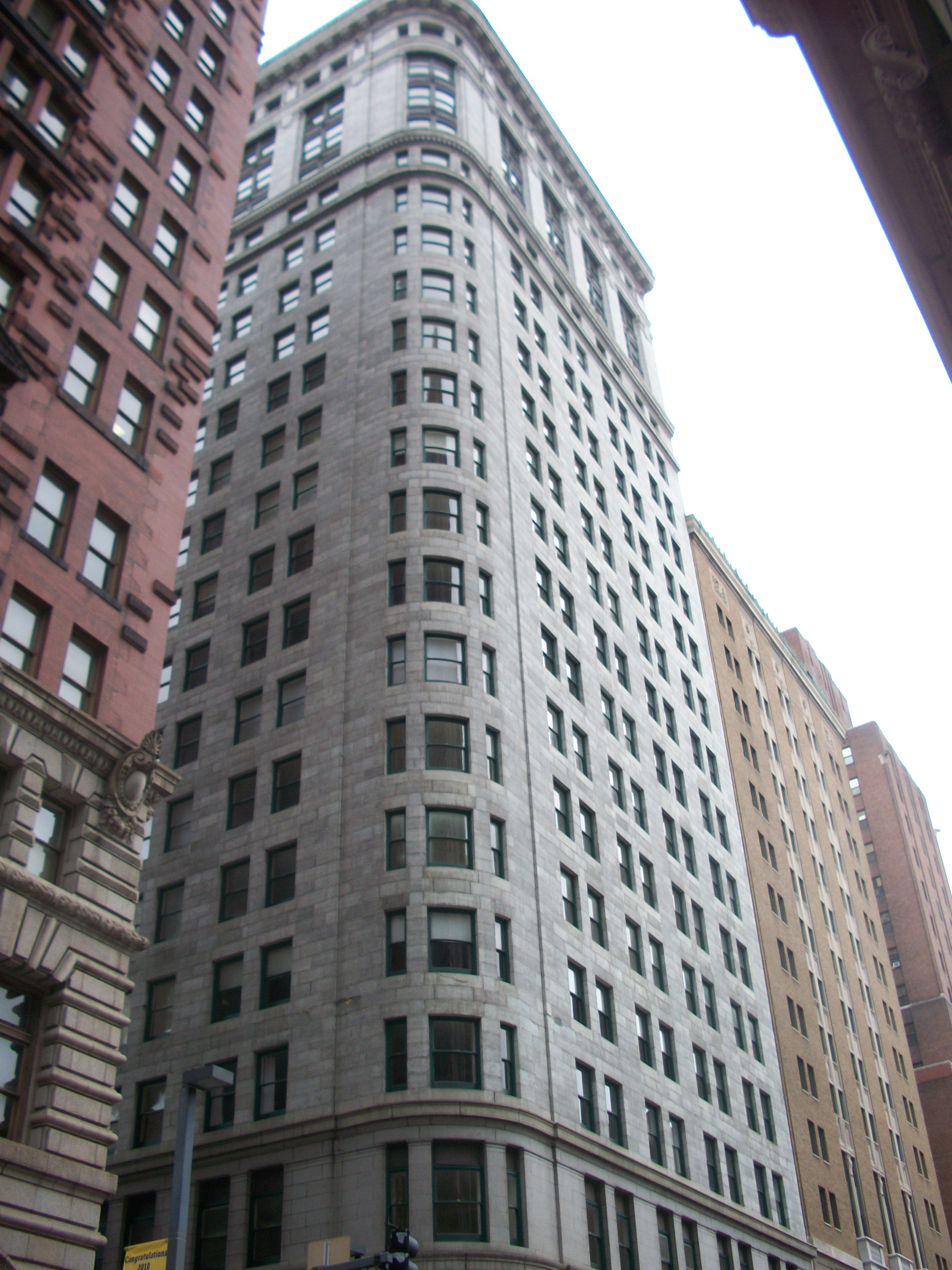
- Interactive map of the The Carlyle area

General information
- Type: Bank and offices, now residential condominium
- Location: 306 Fourth Avenue, Pittsburgh, Pennsylvania
- Coordinates: 40°26′21″N 80°00′04″W
- Completed: 1906

Height
- Roof: 300 ft (91 m)

Technical details
- Floor count: 21
- Floor area: 105,000 ft^{2} (9,755 m^{2})

Design and construction
- Architect: MacClure & Spahr

The Carlyle is a 300 ft (91m) tall skyscraper at Fourth Avenue and Wood Street in Pittsburgh. It was completed in 1906 and has 21 floors. It is tied with Washington Plaza and the Commonwealth Building for 27th tallest building in the city.

== History ==
This 1906 neo-classical building was originally the Union National Bank Building, designed by the architectural firm of MacClure & Spahr. Benno Janssen, who was employed by that firm, had a key role in its design. Union National Bank later became Integra Bank and vacated the building. After many years of relatively low occupancy rates, the structure was converted into condominiums in 2006.

== See also ==
- List of tallest buildings in Pittsburgh

Preceded by The Gardens at Market Square	Pittsburgh Skyscrapers by Height; 300 feet (91 m); 21 floors	Succeeded by Washington Plaza
Preceded by Frick Building	Pittsburgh Skyscrapers by Year of Completion; 1906	Succeeded by Commonwealth Building
