= First National Bank Building (Pittsburgh) =

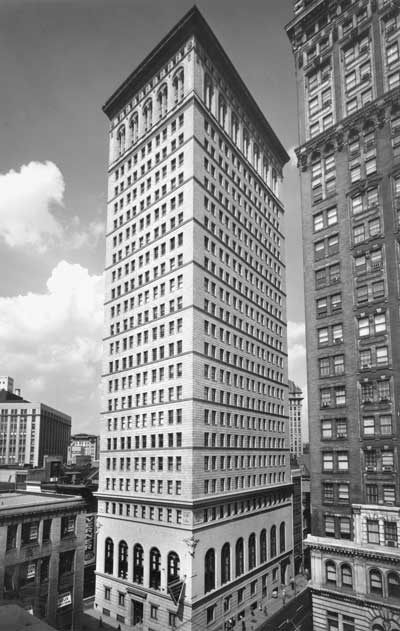
- Interactive map of the First National Bank Building area

General information
- Status: Demolished
- Type: Commercial offices
- Location: 511 Wood Street; Pittsburgh, Pennsylvania
- Coordinates: 40.4411°N 80.0006°W
- Completed: 1909
- Demolished: 1969

Height
- Roof: 117.96 m (387.0 ft)

Technical details
- Floor count: 26

Design and construction
- Architect: D. H. Burnham & Company
- Main contractor: Thompson-Starrett & Company

The First National Bank Building was a high-rise building erected in 1909 in Pittsburgh, Pennsylvania. The building was later enlarged to a 26-story, 118 m (387 ft) skyscraper, making it the tallest in the city when the renovations were completed in 1912. Tenants moved in on April 1, 1912, with the building's fireproofing prominently advertised.

== Demolition ==
The Pittsburgh National Bank (Successor to First National Bank/Peoples First National Bank & Trust) decided to build a new building on the site in the late 1960s. Tenants were told to vacate the building by April 30, 1968.

Work began on razing the structure by late 1968. The structure was completely demolished in 1969 to make way for One PNC Plaza.

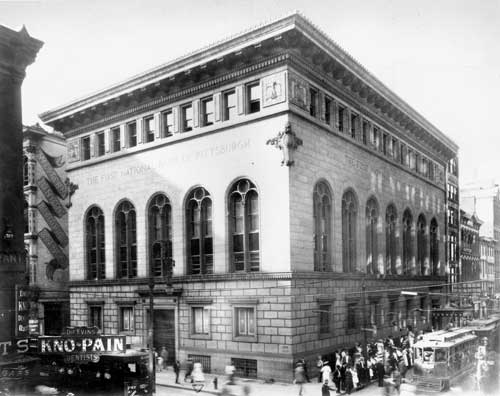
First National Bank Building as originally constructed c. 1909

== See also ==
- List of tallest buildings in Pittsburgh
- List of tallest voluntarily demolished buildings
