= Four Gateway Center =

305 ft skyscraper in Pittsburgh, Pennsylvania

Coordinates: 40.44049°N 80.00409°W

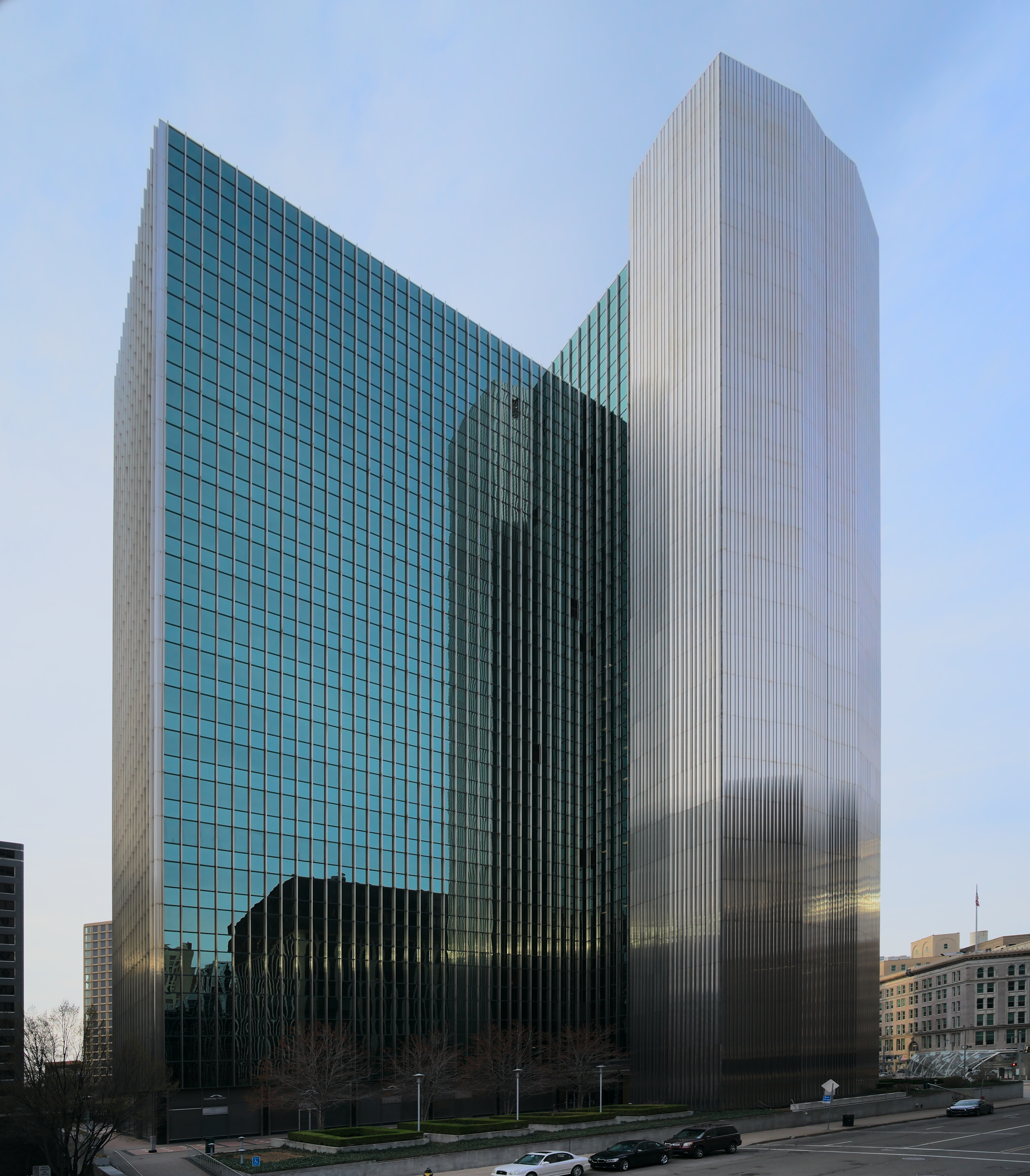
- The Four Gateway Center in 2016 as seen from the southeast.
- Interactive map of the Four Gateway Center area

General information
- Type: Office
- Location: 444 Liberty Avenue, Pittsburgh, United States of America
- Completed: June 1960
- Opening: June 24, 1960
- Cost: $16 million ($177 million in 2025 dollars)
- Owner: Hertz Group
- Operator: Hertz Group

Height
- Height: 305 ft (93 m)

Technical details
- Floor count: 22

Design and construction
- Architect: Harrison & Abramovitz
- Developer: Equitable
- Four Gateway Center
- U.S. Historic district – Contributing property
- Pittsburgh Landmark – PHLF
- Part of: Pittsburgh Renaissance Historic District (ID13000252)

Significant dates
- Added to NRHP: May 2, 2013
- Designated PHLF: 2014

Four Gateway Center is a 305 ft (93 m) skyscraper in Pittsburgh, Pennsylvania. It was completed in 1960 at a cost of $16 million ($177 million in 2025 dollars) and opened on June 24 of that year. It is the 26th tallest building in Pittsburgh and has 22 floors. Virtually all materials used to construct the tower were products of Pennsylvania factories and mills.

== See also ==
- List of tallest buildings in Pittsburgh

Preceded by Washington Plaza	Pittsburgh Skyscrapers by Height; 305 feet (93 m); 22 floors	Succeeded by Frick Building
Preceded by Wyndham Grand	Pittsburgh Skyscrapers by Year of Completion; 1960	Succeeded by Federal Building
