= Three Gateway Center =

344 ft skyscraper in Pittsburgh, Pennsylvania

Coordinates: 40.441814°N 80.005555°W

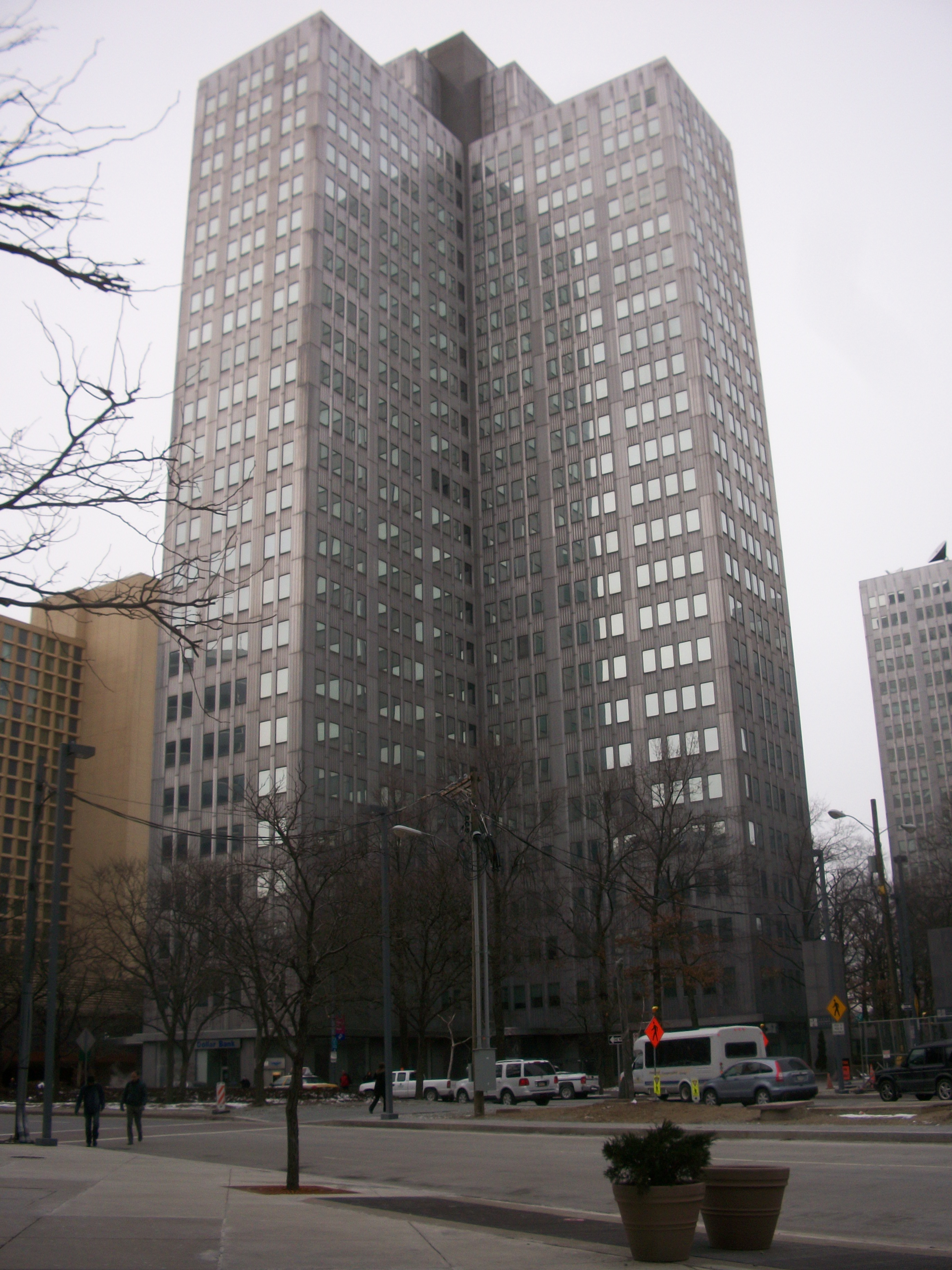
- Interactive map of the Three Gateway Center area

General information
- Type: Office
- Location: 401 Liberty Avenue, Pittsburgh, United States of America
- Construction started: 1950
- Completed: 1952
- Owner: Hertz Group
- Operator: Hertz Group

Height
- Height: 344 ft (105 m)

Technical details
- Floor count: 24

Design and construction
- Architects: Eggers & Higgins
- Developer: Equitable

Three Gateway Center is a 344 ft (105m) skyscraper in Pittsburgh, Pennsylvania. It was completed in 1952 and has 24 floors. It is the 20th tallest building in Pittsburgh.

== 2012 hostage incident ==
On the morning of September 21, 2012, 22-year-old military veteran Klein Michael Thaxton (who reportedly had a criminal record, and was believed to be carrying a gun and two duffel bags) stormed into a 16th-floor office of CW Breitsman Associates and took a male hostage while letting at least two females go. Police believed a male hostage was targeted because Thaxton was believed to have asked for a particular male. Pittsburgh Police, with the assistance of the Allegheny County Sheriff and Port Authority of Allegheny County police, closed off surrounding streets, as well as closing the buildings plaza and the Gateway Center Subway Station for the five-hour standoff, before successfully resolving the situation. It was confined only to one room in the suite, and no injuries or deaths occurred, as evacuations were minimal and people were still occupying other portions of the skyscraper. Thaxton communicated to friends, family (authorities had brought his mother to the scene), and others through his Facebook page during the first few hours of the standoff, the first documented case of such a hostage situation in history, before police had the page shut down to facilitate negotiations.

== See also ==
- List of tallest buildings in Pittsburgh

Preceded by Centre City Tower	Pittsburgh Skyscrapers by Height; 344 feet (105 m); 24 floors	Succeeded by Oliver Building
Preceded by 525 William Penn Place	Pittsburgh Skyscrapers by Year of Completion; 1952	Succeeded by Regional Enterprise Tower
