= William S. Moorhead Federal Building =

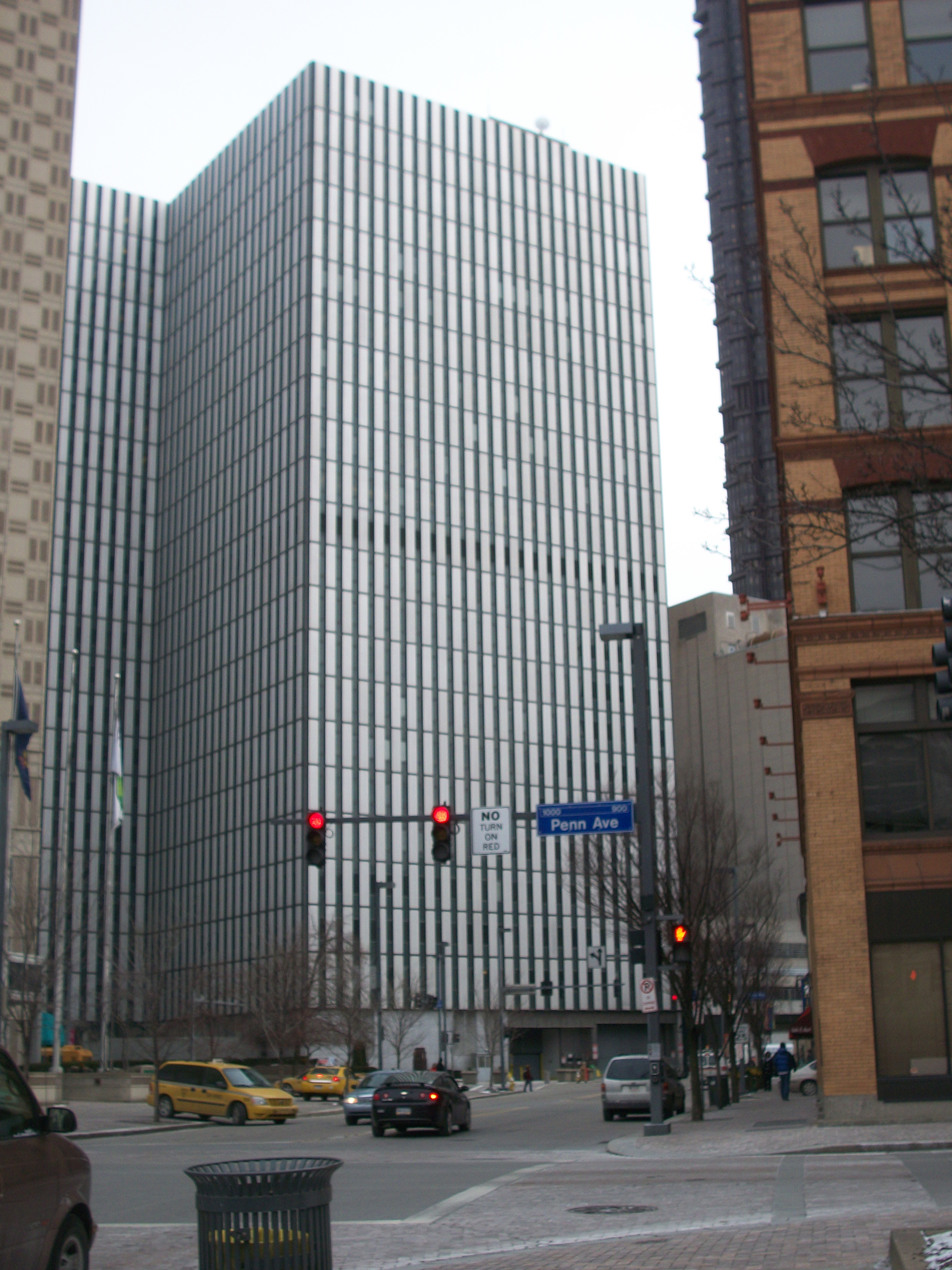
- Northeast side of the Moorhead Building
- Interactive map of the William S. Moorhead Federal Building area

General information
- Type: Office
- Location: 1000 Liberty Avenue
- Coordinates: 40°26′36″N 79°59′40″W
- Construction started: November 9, 1958
- Completed: 1964
- Owner: General Services Administration

Height
- Roof: 340 ft (104 m)

Technical details
- Floor count: 23

Design and construction
- Architects: Altenhof & Bown
- Main contractor: Burchick Construction Company, Inc.

The William S. Moorhead Federal Building is a 340-foot (100 m)-tall skyscraper that is located in downtown Pittsburgh, Pennsylvania, United States. Plans for the building were announced on November 9, 1958, and the structure was completed in 1964.

It has 23 floors and is the 21st tallest building in Pittsburgh.

== History ==
The building, simply known as the Federal Building during its early years, was a $20 million design and construction project that was completed in 1964. It created a centralized home for what had previously been a large number of scattered offices in several different office buildings in Pittsburgh. Designed by Altenhof & Bown, the building replaced an existing Greyhound bus station on the property.

In 1980, the building, which accommodated 35 federal agencies at that time, was renamed the William S. Moorhead Federal Building, in honor of retiring Representative William S. Moorhead. Despite some criticism of the practice of naming buildings after retiring officials, the statute to rename the building was approved on October 9, 1980.

The building currently has 21 tenants, including the Internal Revenue Service, the Veterans Administration, the Army Corps of Engineers (formerly housed in the Manor Building), the Weather Bureau (formerly in the US Post Office and Courthouse), the Federal Bureau of Investigation (formerly in the Union Trust Building) and the Central Intelligence Agency (originally referred to as "Agency 39"), employing 4,000 employees.

== See also ==
- List of tallest buildings in Pittsburgh

== Gallery ==
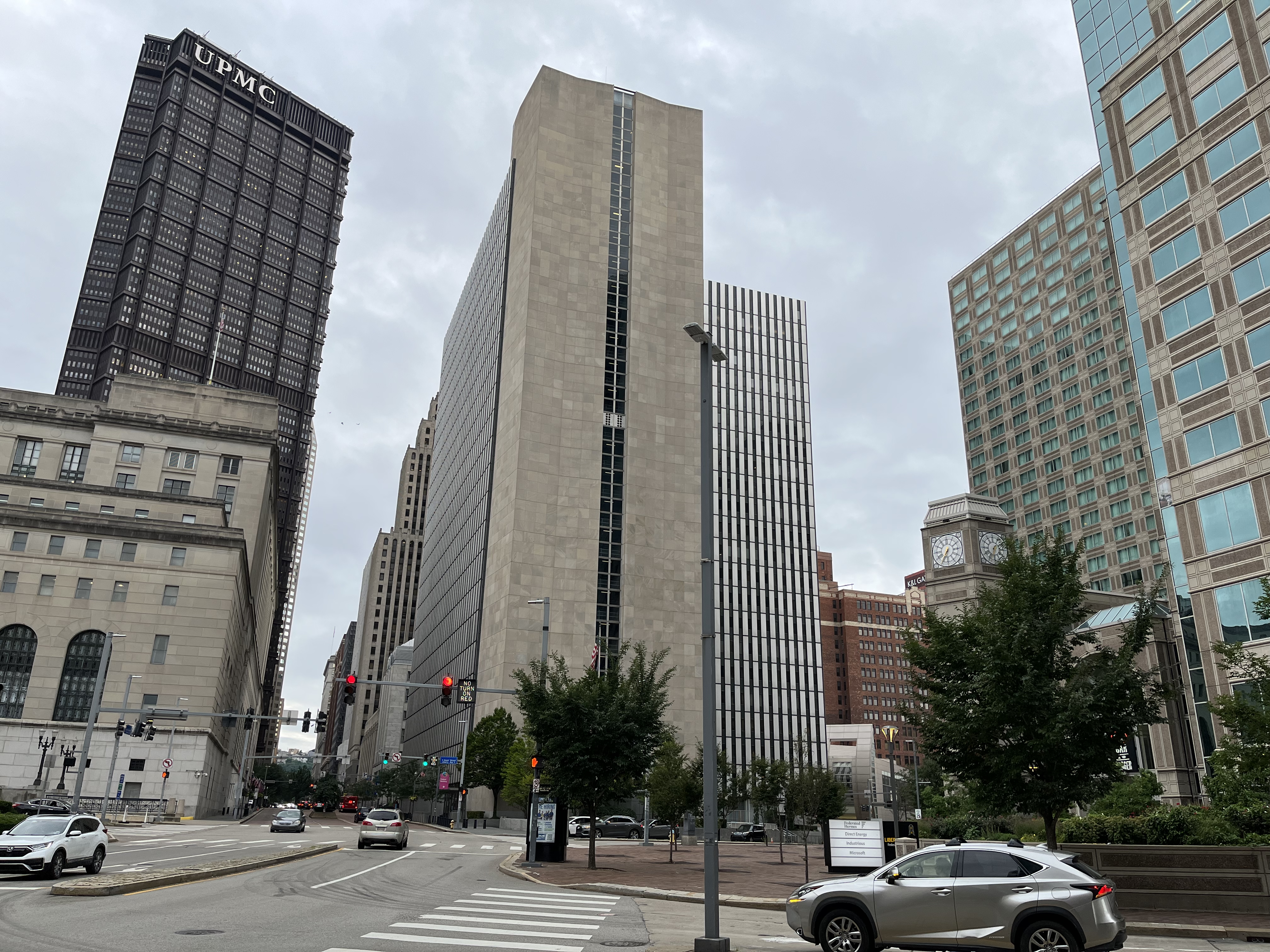
View from Pittsburgh Union Station in 2022

Preceded by Bell Telephone Building	Pittsburgh Skyscrapers by Height; 340 feet (104 m); 23 floors	Succeeded by Centre City Tower
Preceded by Four Gateway Center	Pittsburgh Skyscrapers by Year of Completion; 1964	Succeeded by Washington Plaza
