= Two PNC Plaza =

High-rise office building located in the Golden Triangle of Pittsburgh, Pennsylvania

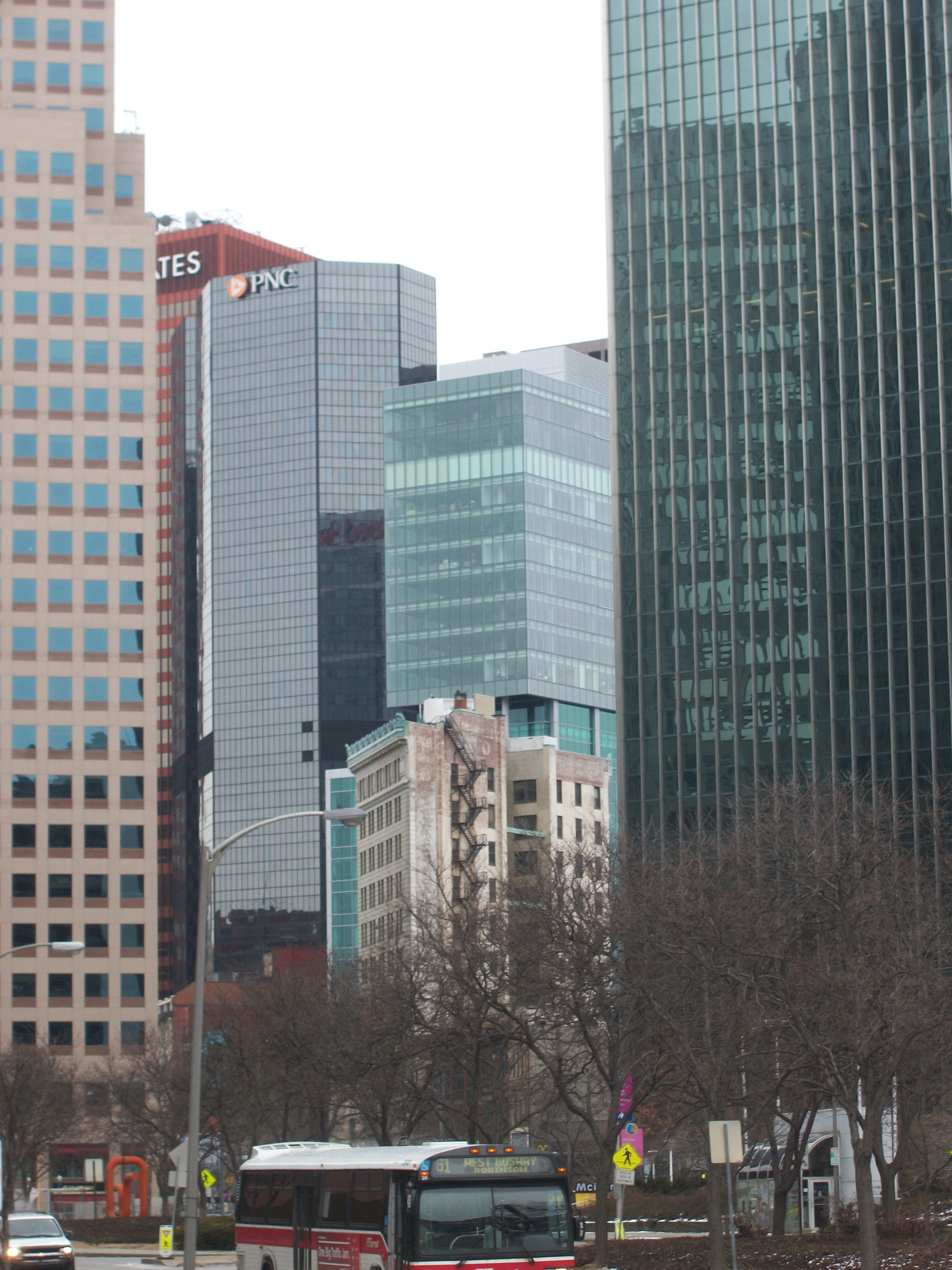
- Two PNC Plaza (left) with the new Three PNC Plaza
- Interactive map of the Two PNC Plaza area

General information
- Location: 620 Liberty Avenue; Pittsburgh
- Coordinates: 40°26′30″N 80°00′03″W
- Completed: 1976
- Owner: PNC Financial Services

Height
- Roof: 446 ft (136 m)

Technical details
- Floor count: 34

Two PNC Plaza (once known as Equibank Plaza) is a high-rise office building located in the Golden Triangle of Pittsburgh, Pennsylvania, United States. Constructed in 1976, it is 446 feet (136 m) in height and has 34 stories, making it the tallest of three buildings in PNC Plaza. In order to make room for the structure, a through street called Oliver Avenue was closed.

The structure was built by Equibank, one of the Pittsburgh region's three major financial institutions, and was completed four years after and only a few feet away from One PNC Plaza, the home of their major rival (which was then named Pittsburgh National Bank). Equibank went into a sharp decline in the 1980s due to poor investments surrounding a Florida housing bubble and a series of defaulted loans from newly privatized South American companies. Simultaneously, PNC was growing and began expanding into their rival's building next door. PNC eventually not only acquired the building but also a portion of Equibank's operations (the company was merged with the smaller Integra Bank in 1992, Integra was purchased by National City Corp. in 1995, and PNC purchased National City in 2008); PNC and KeyBank currently operate many former Equibank branches.

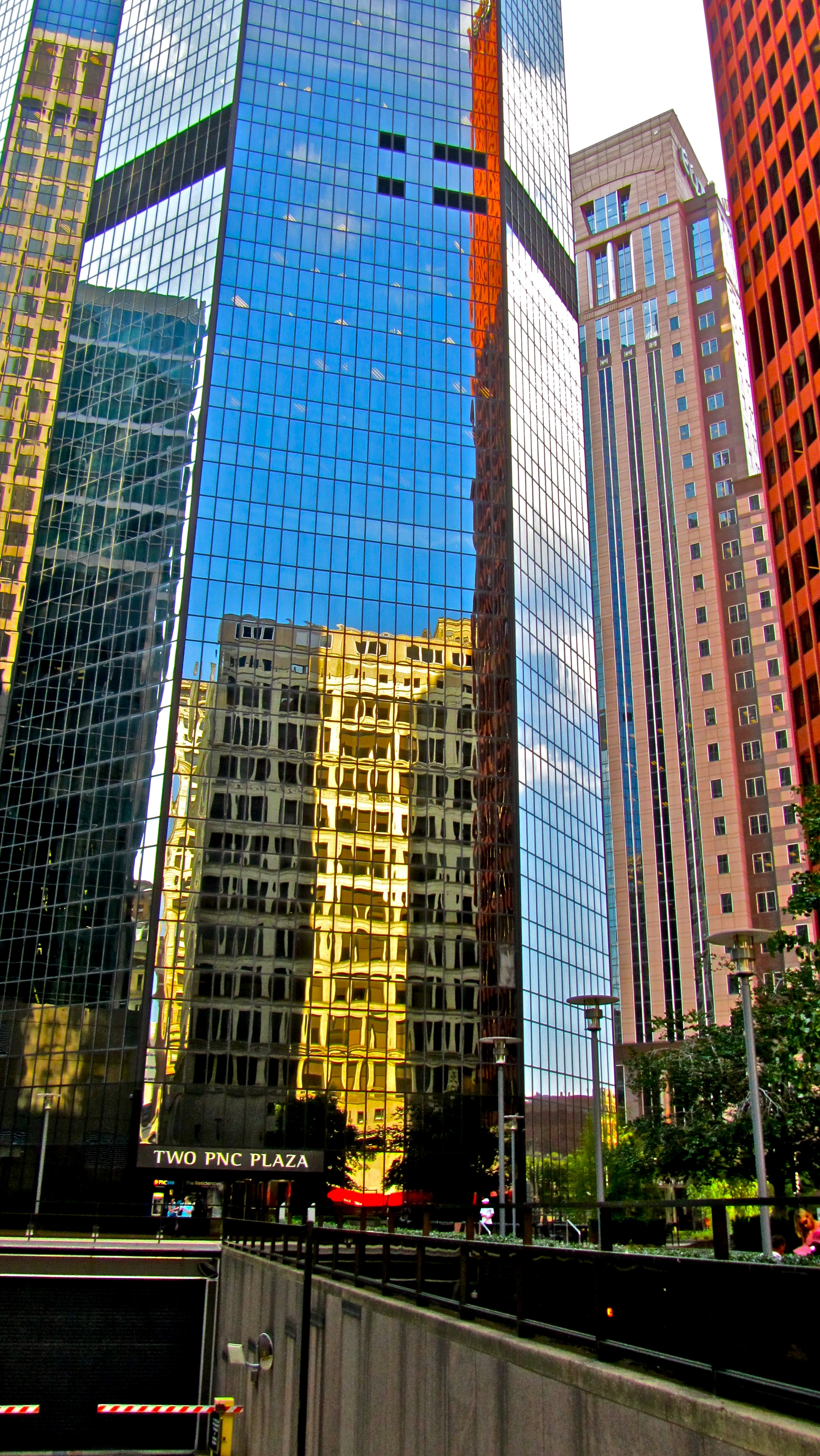
Street view

== Sources ==
- Toker, Franklin (2007). Buildings of Pittsburgh. Pittsburgh: Chicago: Society of Architectural Historians; Santa Fe: Center for American Places; Charlottesville: In association with the University of Virginia Press. ISBN 978-0-8139-2650-6.

Preceded by EQT Plaza	Pittsburgh Skyscrapers by Height; 445 feet (136 m); 34 floors	Succeeded by Koppers Tower
Preceded by One PNC Plaza	Pittsburgh Skyscrapers by Year of Completion; 1975	Succeeded by Federated Tower
