= Three PNC Plaza =

361-foot-tall skyscraper in Pittsburgh, Pennsylvania

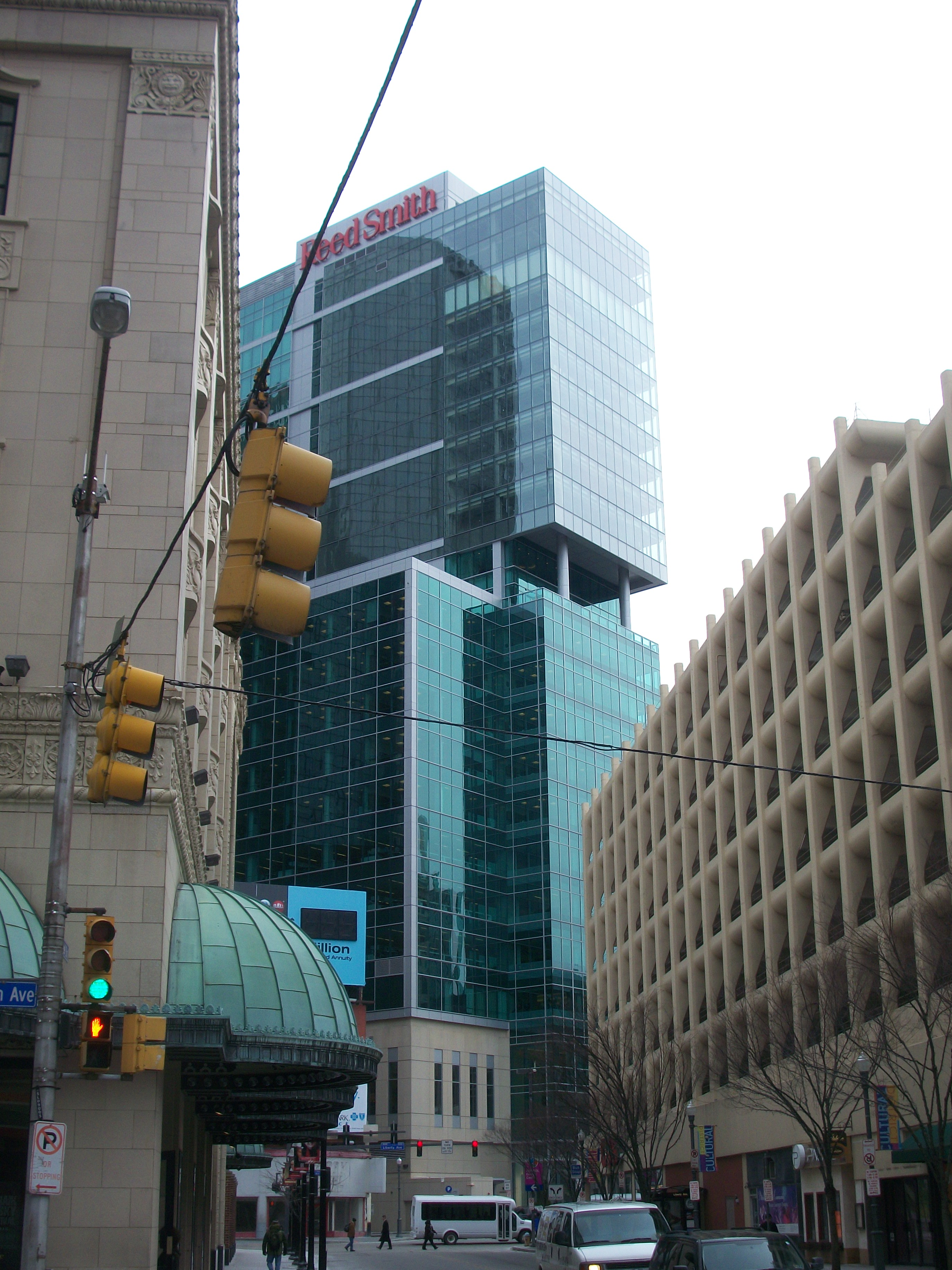
- Three PNC Plaza in 2011
- Interactive map of the Three PNC Plaza area

General information
- Type: Mixed Use
- Location: 201 Fifth Avenue
- Coordinates: 40.4414°N 80.0013°W
- Construction started: 2006
- Completed: 2009
- Cost: $179 million ($295 million in current dollars)
- Owner: PNC Financial Services Group

Height
- Roof: 361 ft (110 m)

Technical details
- Floor count: 23
- Floor area: 750,008 sq ft (69,678.0 m^{2})

Design and construction
- Architect: Gensler/Louis D. Astorino
- Developer: Oxford Development Company
- Structural engineer: Astorino

Three PNC Plaza is a 361-foot-tall (110 m) skyscraper in Pittsburgh, Pennsylvania. It was announced on December 19, 2005 and completed in 2009 with 23 floors. It was the tallest building constructed in the city since Highmark Tower was completed in 1988, until The Tower at PNC Plaza was completed in 2015. It contains 326,000 square feet (30,300 m^{2}) of office space, a 185-room Fairmont Hotel, and 28 condominium units. The $179 million ($295 million in current dollars) project created 800 construction-related jobs with a $35 million payroll ($57.7 million in current dollars). Thirteen buildings were demolished to make way for the building.

Three PNC Plaza is a LEED certified green building. It is one of the nation's largest mixed use green buildings.

International law firm Reed Smith moved their corporate headquarters into the building.

== See also ==
- List of tallest buildings in Pittsburgh
- Fairmont Hotels and Resorts

Preceded by Federated Tower	Pittsburgh Skyscrapers by Height; 361 feet (110 m); 23 floors	Succeeded by Regional Enterprise Tower
Preceded by Fifth Avenue Place	Pittsburgh Skyscrapers by Year of Completion; 2009	Succeeded by Tower at PNC Plaza
