= One PNC Plaza =

High-rise office building in Pittsburgh, Pennsylvania

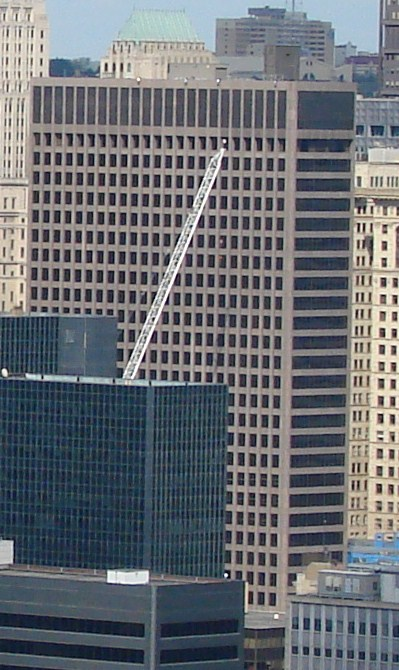
- Interactive map of the One PNC Plaza area
- Alternative names: Pittsburgh National Bank Building

General information
- Type: Commercial offices
- Location: 249 Fifth Avenue, Pittsburgh, Pennsylvania
- Coordinates: 40°26′28″N 80°00′02″W
- Completed: 1972
- Owner: PNC Financial Services

Height
- Roof: 129.24 m (424.0 ft)

Technical details
- Floor count: 30
- Lifts/elevators: 12

Design and construction
- Architect: Welton Becket Associates

One PNC Plaza is a high-rise office building located in the Golden Triangle neighborhood of the Central Business District of Pittsburgh, Pennsylvania, United States. Constructed in 1972, it is 129.24 m (424.0 ft) 30 stories. It houses the general offices for PNC Financial Services. The building is the former location of PNC's corporate headquarters before completion of the Tower at PNC Plaza.

The building was constructed on the site of the former First National Bank Building, a 26-story 1912 beaux-arts tower, that was only 11 m (36 ft) shorter.

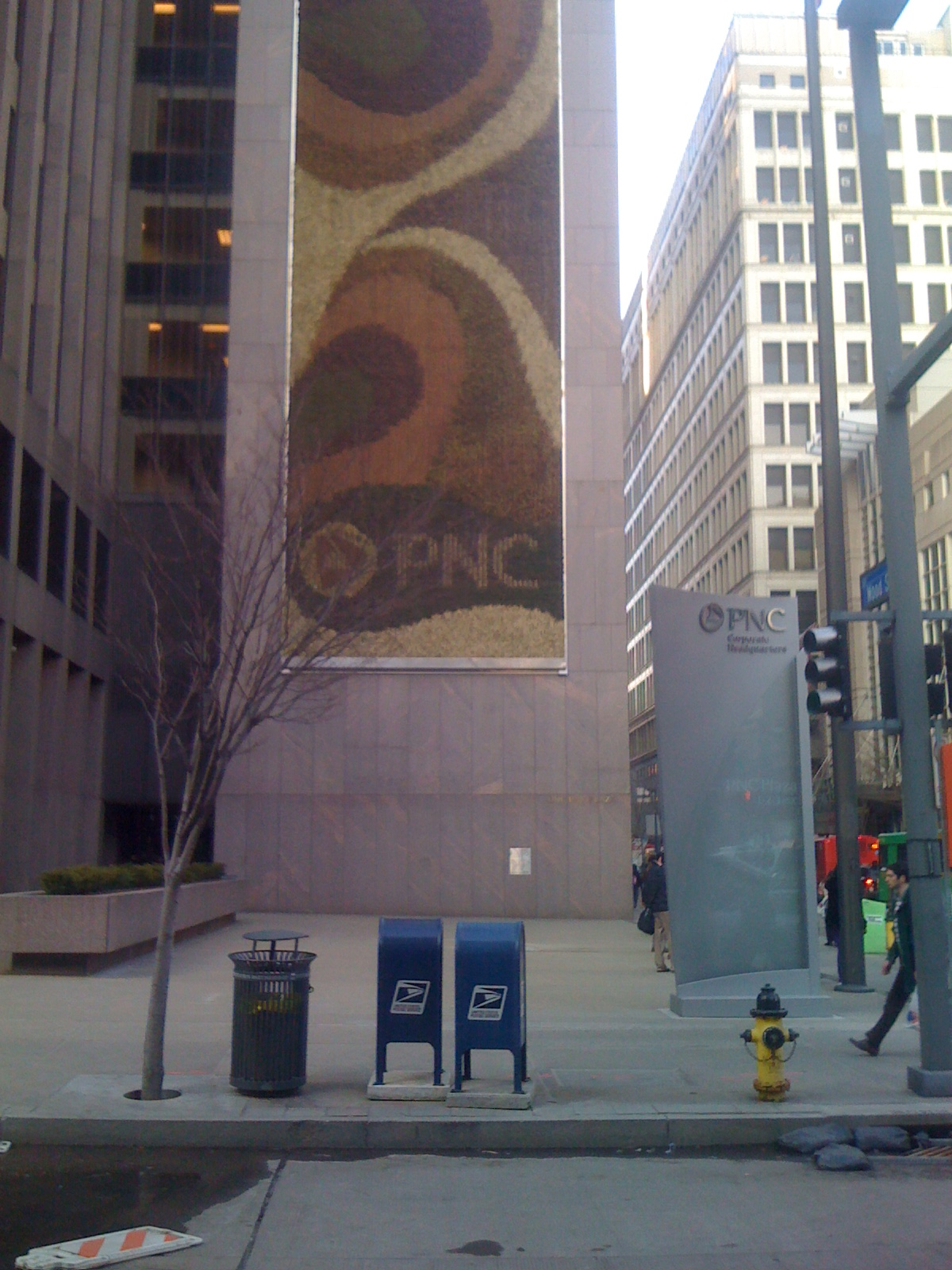
One PNC Plaza at grade.

== See also ==
- List of tallest buildings in Pittsburgh

Preceded by Regional Enterprise Tower	Pittsburgh Skyscrapers by Height; 424 feet (129 m); 30 floors	Succeeded by EQT Plaza
Preceded by Centre City Tower	Pittsburgh Skyscrapers by Year of Completion; 1972	Succeeded by Two PNC Plaza
