= Centre City Tower (Pittsburgh) =

341-foot tall skyscraper in Pittsburgh, Pennsylvania

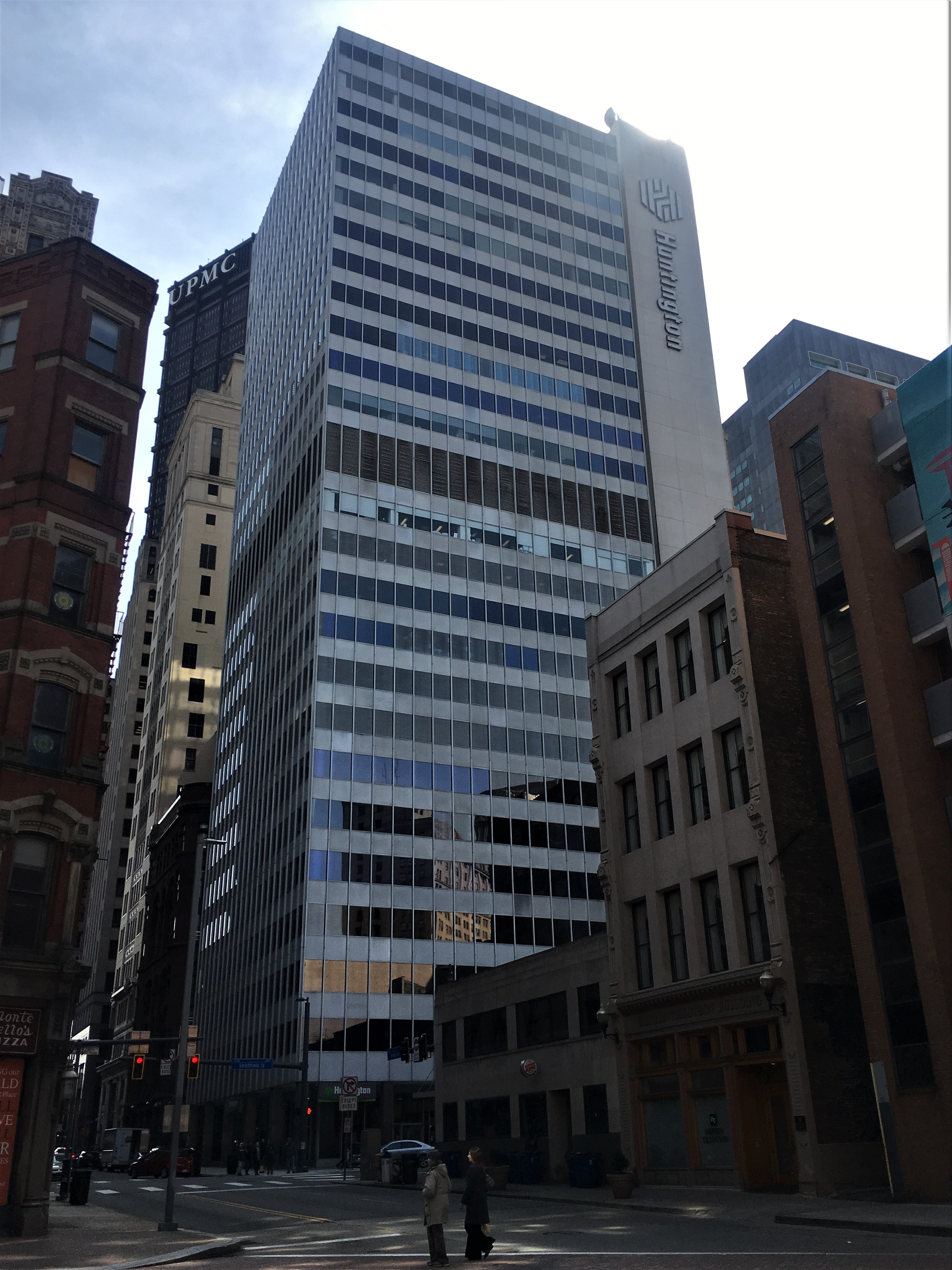
- Centre City Tower, Pittsburgh, Pennsylvania in March 2019
- Interactive map of the Centre City Tower area

General information
- Type: Office
- Location: 650 Smithfield Street
- Coordinates: 40°26′33″N 79°59′48″W
- Completed: 1971

Height
- Roof: 341 ft (104 m)

Technical details
- Floor count: 26

Design and construction
- Architect: A. Epstein and Sons

The Centre City Tower (also spelled Center City Tower) is a 341-foot-tall (104 m) skyscraper in Pittsburgh, Pennsylvania. It contains 26 floors, and stands as the 20th-tallest building in the city. Centre City Tower was constructed in 1971, and was later renovated in 2002. The entire building contains Class B office space, and is an example of modern architecture.

== See also ==
- List of tallest buildings in Pittsburgh

Preceded by Federal Building	Pittsburgh Skyscrapers by Height; 341 feet (104 m); 26 floors	Succeeded by Three Gateway Center
Preceded by U.S. Steel Tower	Pittsburgh Skyscrapers by Year of Completion; 1971	Succeeded by One PNC Plaza
