= Koppers Tower =

Skyscraper in Pittsburgh

Koppers Building
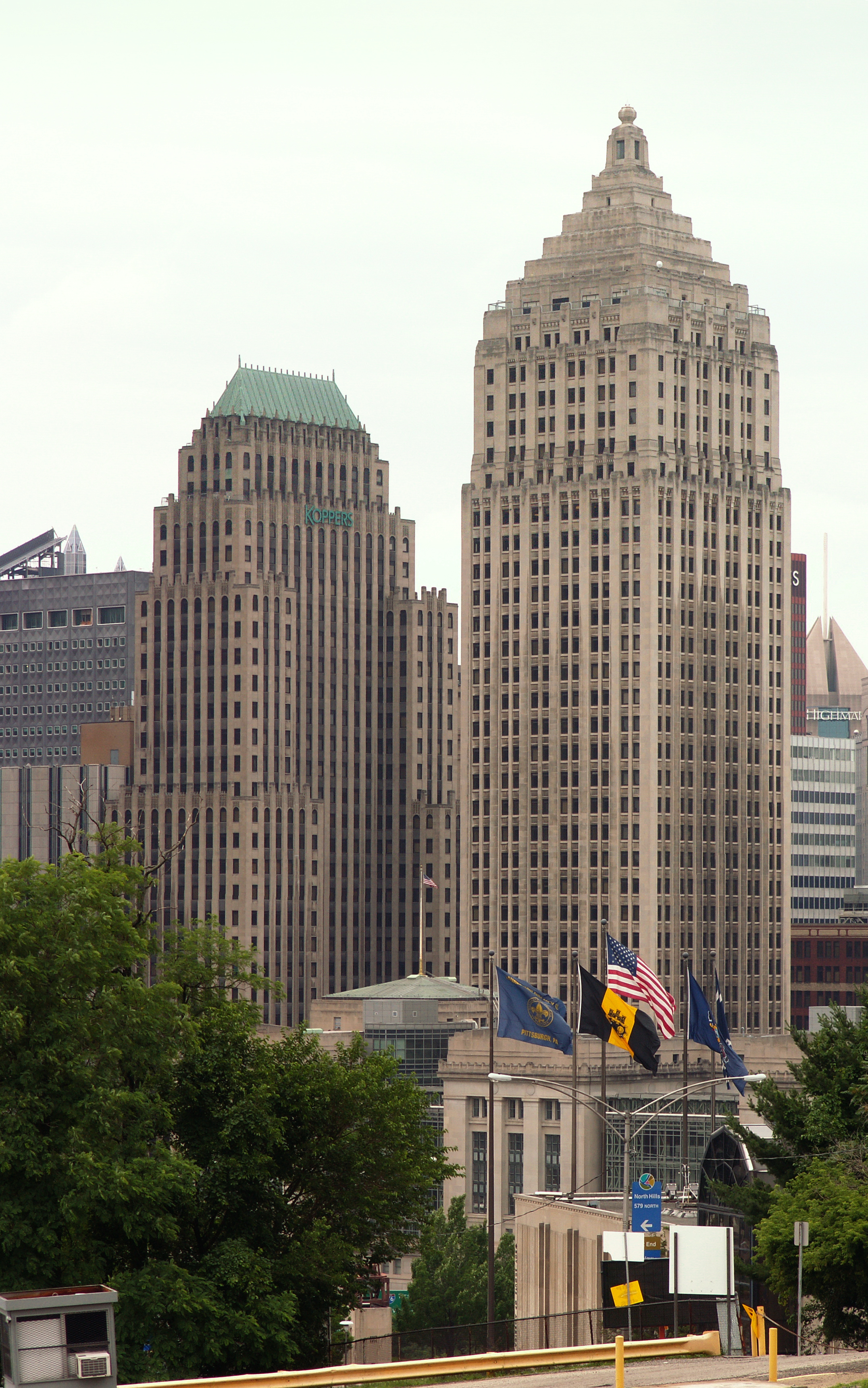
- Koppers Building (left) and Gulf Tower, 2015
- Interactive map of the Koppers Building area

General information
- Type: Offices
- Location: 436 Seventh Avenue, Pittsburgh, Pennsylvania
- Coordinates: 40°26′31″N 79°59′44″W
- Construction started: 1927
- Completed: March, 1929
- Cost: $5.3 million ($99.4 million today)

Height
- Roof: 475 ft (145 m)

Technical details
- Floor count: 34
- Floor area: 290,464 ft^{2} (26,985 m^{2})
- Lifts/elevators: 13

Design and construction
- Architect: Graham, Anderson, Probst & White with E. P. Mellon
- Developer: Andrew W. Mellon
- Main contractor: Mellon-Stuart

Pittsburgh Landmark – PHLF
- Designated: 1973

Koppers Building is a historical building in Pittsburgh, Pennsylvania, commissioned by Andrew W. Mellon and completed in 1929. The building is named after the Koppers Chemical Corporation and is one of the major features of Downtown Pittsburgh.

== Overview ==
Koppers Building was completed in March 1929, and it has 34 floors at a cost of $5.3 million (equivalent to $99.4 million in 2025). It rises 475 feet (145 m) above Downtown Pittsburgh. Its address is Grant Street & Seventh Avenue. It is considered one of the best examples of Art Deco construction and ornamentation in Pittsburgh.

It is constructed with Indiana limestone with a polished granite base and dark copper roof. Inside the Koppers Building the lobby is richly decorated with marble walls. Its copper roof is pitched in a chateau-like design and is illuminated at night. The building was designed by the architectural firm of Graham, Anderson, Probst & White.

In February 1948, Equitable of New York purchased the building for $6 million (equivalent to $86.5 million in 2025).

| Preceded by Two PNC Plaza | Pittsburgh Skyscrapers by Height; 475 feet (145 m); 35 floors | Succeeded by Grant Building |
| Preceded by Grant Building | Pittsburgh Skyscrapers by Year of Completion; 1929 | Succeeded by Gulf Tower |
