= Allentown Line =

Allentown Line may refer to:

- Bethlehem Line, a former SEPTA Regional Rail line between Philadelphia and Allentown, Pennsylvania.
- Brown Line (Pittsburgh) an out-of-service branch of the Pittsburgh Light Rail system, renamed from Route 52 Allentown.
