= 525 William Penn Place =

Skyscraper located in downtown Pittsburgh, Pennsylvania

Coordinates: 40°26′25″N 79°59′52″W

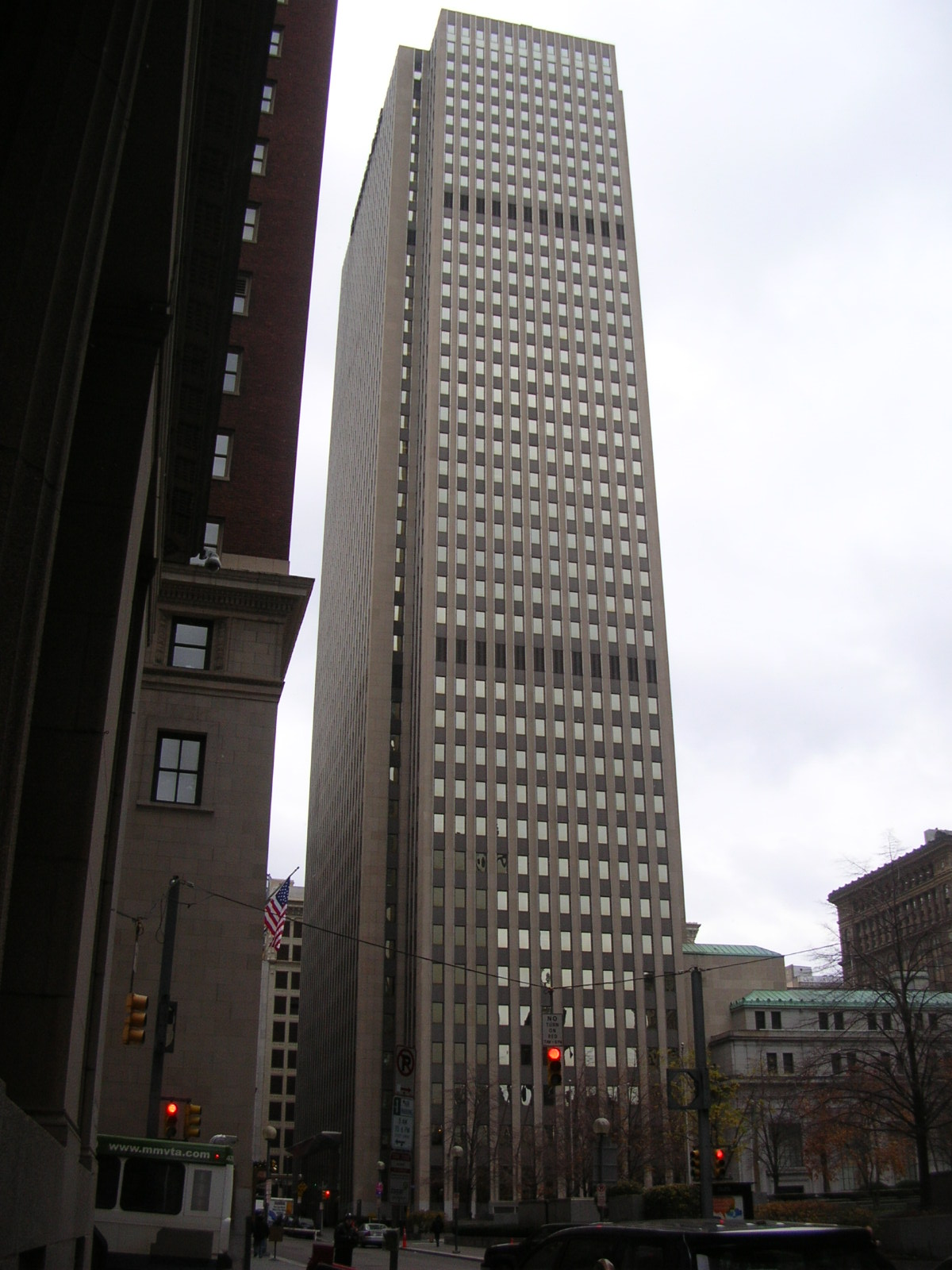
- 525 William Penn Place
- Interactive map of the 525 William Penn Place area

General information
- Type: Office / Commercial
- Location: 525 William Penn Place, Pittsburgh, Pennsylvania
- Construction started: April 1, 1949
- Completed: 1951
- Opening: 1951
- Cost: $67.65 million
- Owner: FAC 525, LLC
- Operator: CBRE

Height
- Roof: 520 feet (160 m)

Technical details
- Floor count: 41
- Floor area: 942,665 square feet (87,576.4 m^{2})
- Lifts/elevators: 20

Design and construction
- Architect: Harrison & Abramovitz
- Developer: John W. Galbreath
- Main contractor: Turner Construction Company

525 William Penn Place (also known as the Citizens Bank Tower) is a skyscraper located in downtown Pittsburgh, Pennsylvania. It was completed in 1951 for the Mellon National Bank and the U.S. Steel Corporation. At 520 feet (160 m) tall, it was the second-tallest building in Pittsburgh until 1970, and the third-tallest until 1984. The building has 41 floors and approximately 950,000 square feet (88,000 m^{2}) of office space. Presently it is the third-largest office building by square feet in downtown Pittsburgh. In 2016, BNY Mellon sold the building for $67.65 million (equivalent to $90.8 million in 2025).

== History ==
525 William Penn Place was one of the first skyscrapers built in Pittsburgh as part of longtime Mayor David Lawrence's Renaissance I building initiative to rebuild downtown Pittsburgh. The building was built by the then Pittsburgh Pirates owner John W. Galbreath with loans from the Mellon National Bank and additional financing from insurance companies. At the time of construction, Mellon purchased floors 2–8 by deed in 1951 from John W. Galbreath. The building was designed by Harrison & Abramovitz with construction by the Turner Construction Company. It was built on the site of the Henry Hotel which was demolished to prepare the site for the tower in 1949.

The original plan for the building was to construct the ground floors in the same architectural design as the Mellon National Bank on Smithfield Street adjacent to the skyscraper and to allow open flow of Mellon employees between the two buildings with Mellon occupying the first eight floors. This plan was later modified during construction to give the entire building its own modernist style and an open shared lobby with three elevator banks and multiple passages between the skyscraper and the Mellon National Bank on Smithfield Street. U.S. Steel leased the floors 9 through 37 for their corporation and various subsidiaries. The top floors were reserved for the T. Mellon & Sons Company, various Mellon family charities offices, and a penthouse for philanthropist Richard King Mellon.

U.S. Steel was the primary tenant until completing their own skyscraper, U.S. Steel Tower, on Grant Street in 1970. At that time, Mellon Bank owned floors 2-8 and leased the remainder of the building from the John W. Galbraith Co. In April 1982, Mellon Bank finally purchased the remainder of the building for $10 million (equivalent to $33.4 million in 2025).

Mellon Bank (The Bank of New York Mellon since 2007) remained the owner of 525 William Penn Place and the largest occupier of space at approximately half the building (approximately 500,000 ft^{2} [46,000 m^{2}]). The remainder of the space is leased to various businesses and law firms with Citizens Bank as the largest tenant occupying approximately 1/4 of the building at 250,000 ft^{2} (23,000 m^{2}). Citizens Bank also leases from Mellon signage rights to the building which include the right to erect signage at the top of the tower and above the entry closest to Fifth Avenue.

In January 2015, BNY Mellon announced it would begin slowly moving employees to other space in downtown Pittsburgh and seek a buyer for the building.

In September 2016 BNY Mellon, National Association sold it to FAC 525, LLC (a single purpose entity) for $67.65 million (equivalent to $90.8 million in 2025).

== Renovations ==
The first major building renovation of 525 William Penn Place occurred from 1986 to 1987 with a complete building renewal. New windows (approximately 3,344), heating, air, plumbing, and new mechanical systems were installed. In 2001, a new renovation commenced with the complete rebuilding of the lobby, building entrances, elevator cabs, and restrooms. The building was awarded an Energy Star label in 2008 for its operating efficiency. In 2010, the building was further awarded a Gold Level LEED certification by the US Green Building Council.

== Building name ==
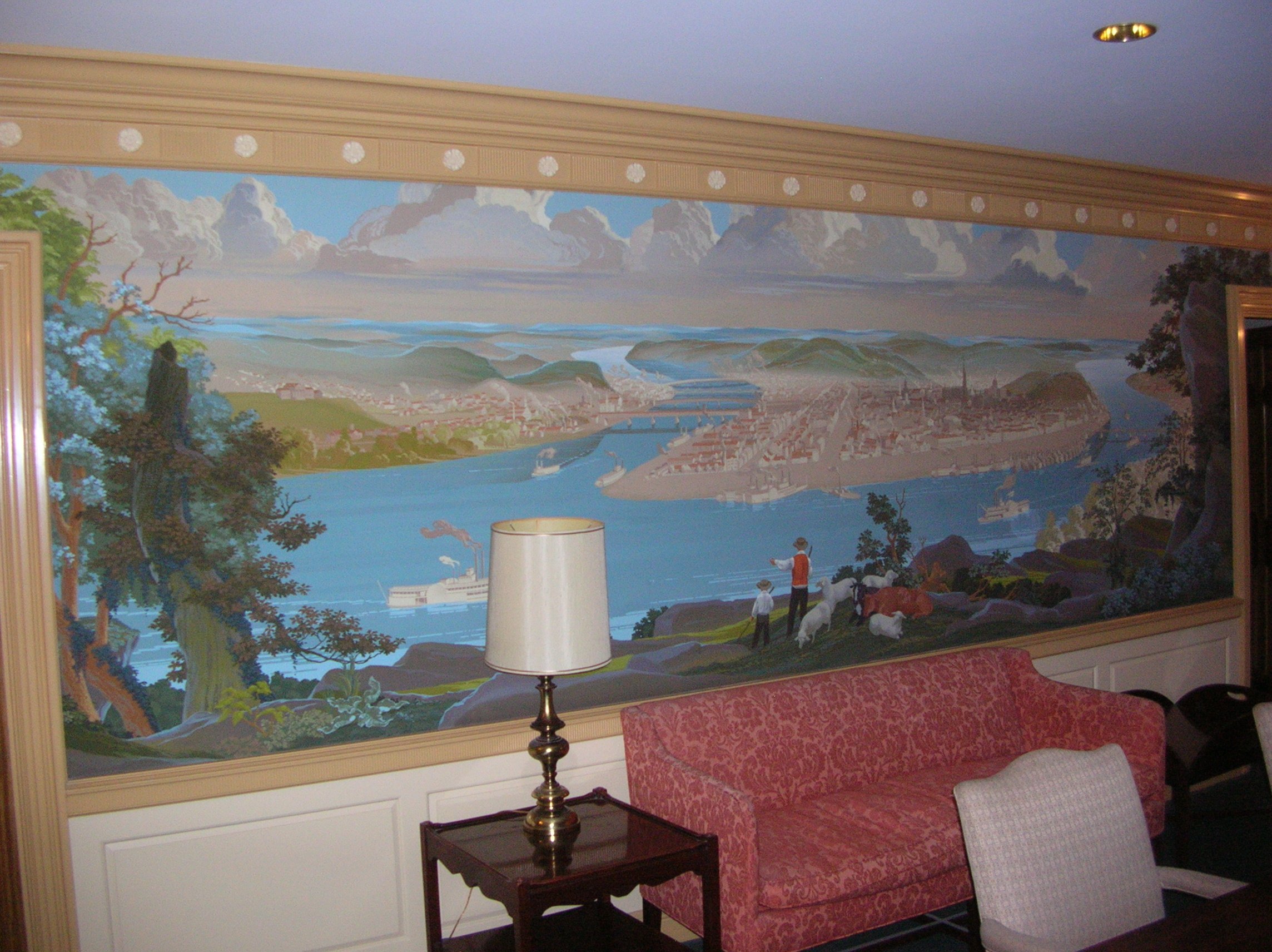
Wall mural painting in the anteroom to the 41st floor former Mellon Executive Board room, 525 William Penn Place. Mural depicts Pittsburgh Point in 1849 as reproduced from a painting by B.F. King.

Being primarily a bank office building and due to the ever changing banking industry, the name of the building has often been in confusion. Originally known as 525 William Penn Place from construction until 1970, it was then named the Mellon Bank Center. It was renamed again in 1984 with the completion of One Mellon Bank Center two blocks away with the designation of Three Mellon Bank Center (later Three Mellon Center). In 2002 it reverted to the original name of 525 William Penn Place with Mellon's sale of its retail banking business to Citizens Bank.

== Popular culture ==
The skyscraper makes a cameo in the 2010 rap video Black and Yellow, the camera panning skyward from a street view.

== See also ==
- List of tallest buildings in Pittsburgh

Preceded by K&L Gates Center	Pittsburgh Skyscrapers by Height; 520 feet (158 m); 41 floors	Succeeded by Cathedral of Learning
Preceded by Cathedral of Learning	Pittsburgh Skyscrapers by Year of Completion; 1951	Succeeded by Three Gateway Center
