= Wood Street station (Pittsburgh) =

Wood Street
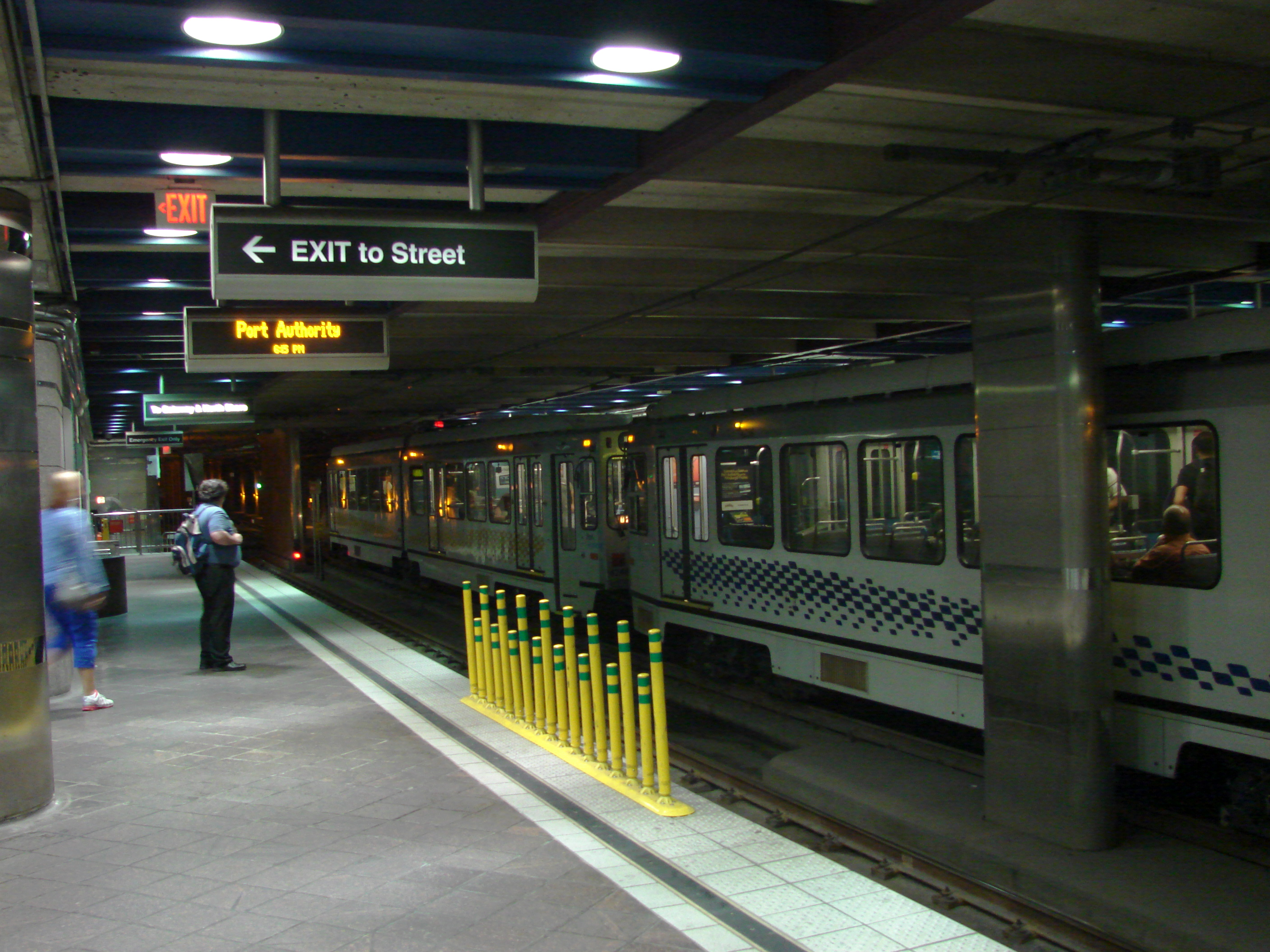

General information
- Location: Wood Street and Liberty Avenue; Pittsburgh, Pennsylvania
- Coordinates: 40.4429°N 79.99891°W
- Owner: Pittsburgh Regional Transit
- Line: Downtown subway
- Platforms: 2 side platforms
- Tracks: 2
- Connections: PRT: 61A, 61B, 61C, 71B; PRT: 28X (to West Busway/Airport) at Liberty Av & Tito Wy; PRT: Y46 , Y47 , Y49 , P1 , G2 at Wood St. PRTX (6th Av/Wood St); PRT: G3 , G31 at 7th St./Liberty Av; PRT: P7 , P17 , P69 , P76 , P78 at Liberty Av & Tito Wy; Westmoreland County Transit Authority: 1, 2, 3, 4 Beaver County Transit Authority: 1, 3, 4 Washington City Transit Commuter Route

Construction
- Structure type: Underground
- Accessible: Yes

History
- Opened: July 3, 1985

Passengers
- 2020: 4,457 (weekday boardings)

Services
Preceding station	Pittsburgh Regional Transit	Following station
Gateway toward Allegheny	Blue Line	Steel Plaza toward South Hills Village
Gateway toward Allegheny	Red Line	Steel Plaza toward South Hills Village
Gateway toward Allegheny	Silver Line	Steel Plaza toward Library
Former services
Preceding station	Port Authority of Allegheny County	Following station
Gateway Terminus	Brown Line	Steel Plaza toward South Hills Junction
Gateway Terminus	47D Drake 1984–1993	Steel Plaza toward Drake
Preceding station	Pittsburgh Regional Transit	Following station
Gateway toward Allegheny	Subway Local	Steel Plaza toward Station Square
Location

Wood Street station is a station on the Pittsburgh Light Rail system in Downtown Pittsburgh, operated by Pittsburgh Regional Transit. The station is located within the system's free fare zone, which also includes First Avenue, Steel Plaza, Gateway, North Side, and Allegheny.

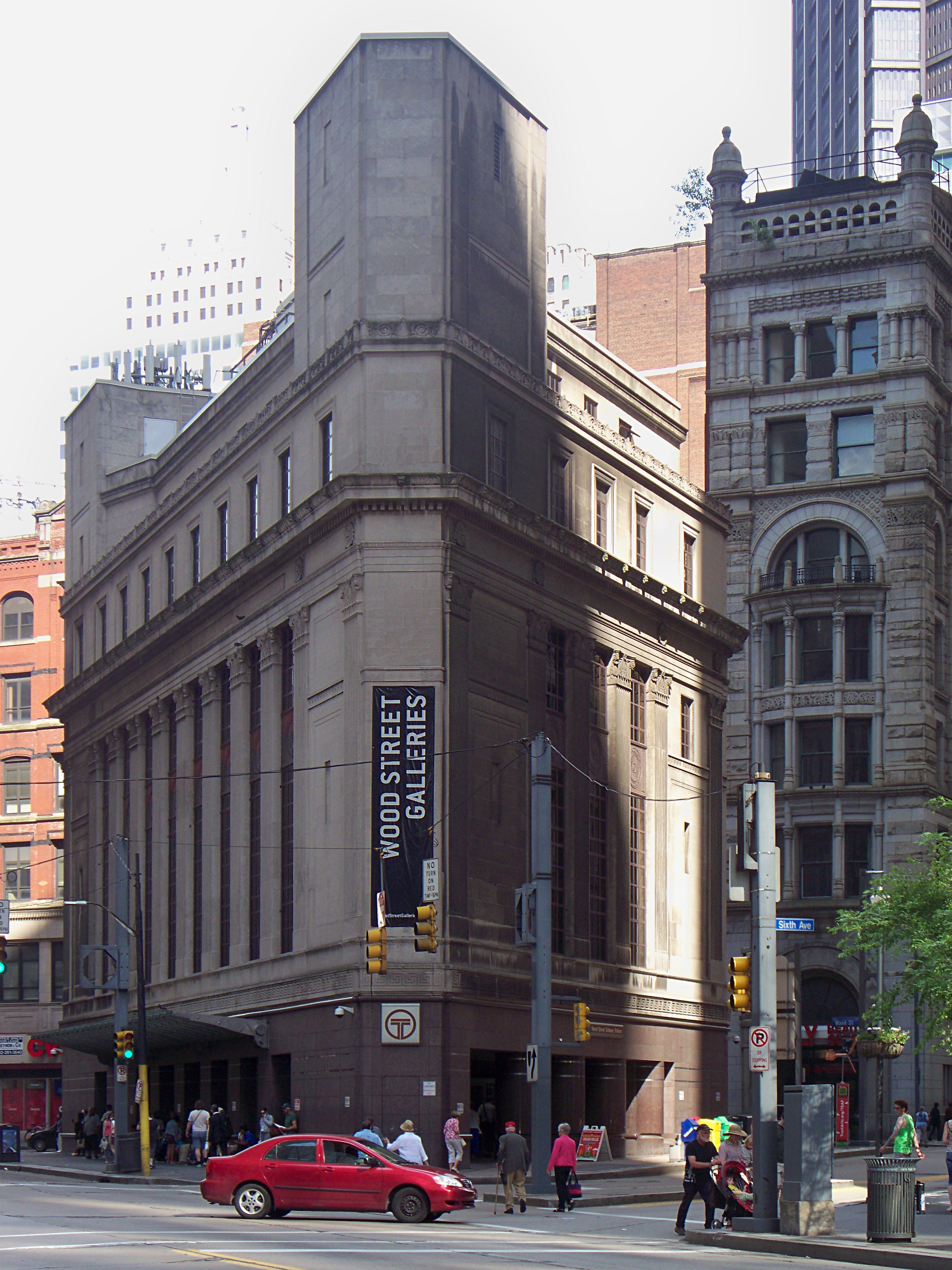
Station building

It is located at the intersection of Wood Street and Liberty Avenue. Wood Street Galleries, an art gallery, is located directly above the station entrance. The station itself plays no role in fare collection, which is done on board the train.

The stop serves the northern portion of downtown, which features major office buildings such as One PNC Plaza, K&L Gates Center, and EQT Plaza. The Cultural District, which features performance venues such as the Benedum Center, the Byham Theater, and Heinz Hall is located in the blocks just to the north of the station, while the David L. Lawrence Convention Center is within walking distance.
