= Gateway station (Pittsburgh) =

Gateway
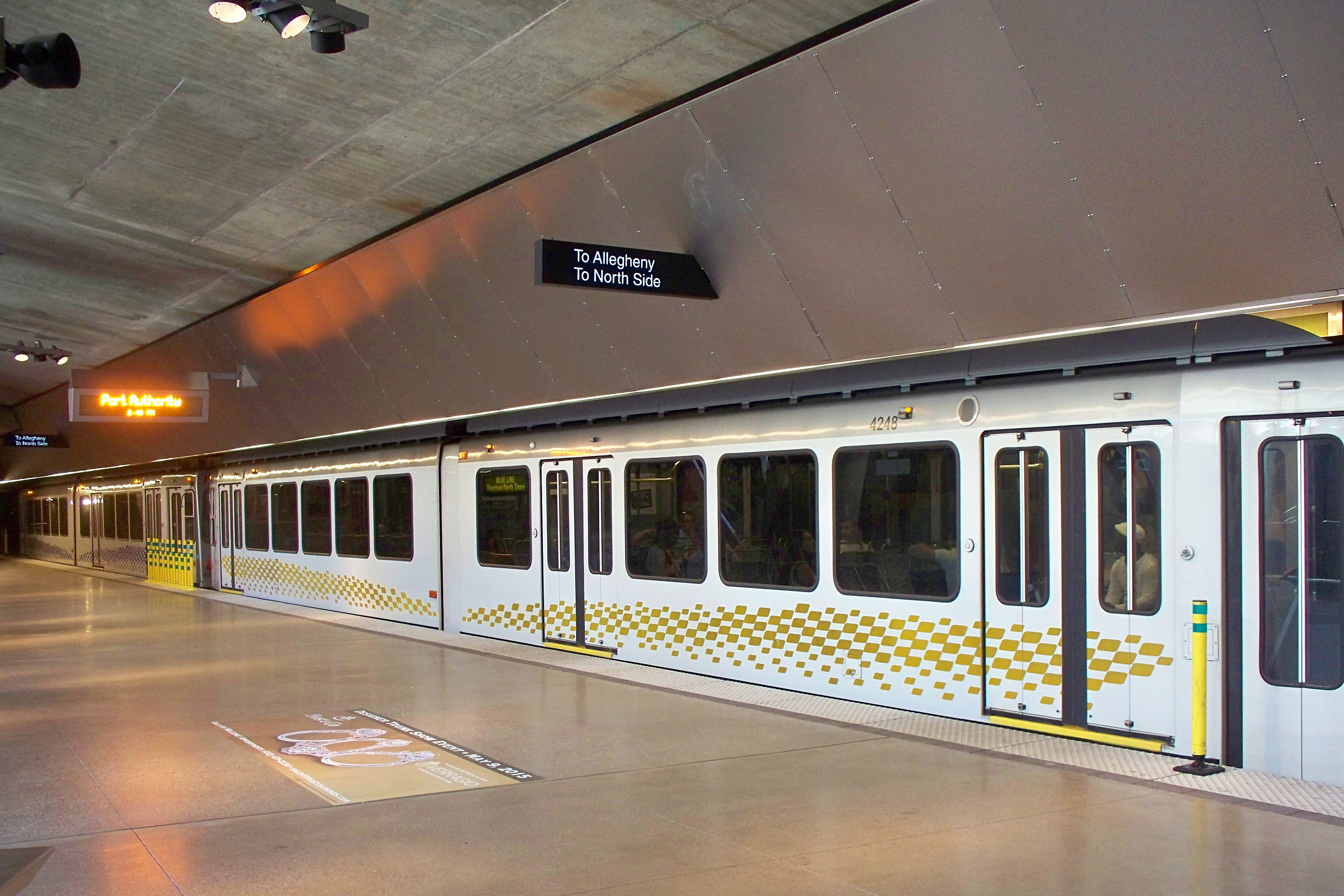
- Gateway Center station platform in 2015

General information
- Location: Stanwix Street and Liberty Avenue; Pittsburgh, Pennsylvania
- Coordinates: 40.4416°N 80.0032°W
- Owner: Pittsburgh Regional Transit
- Line: Downtown subway
- Platforms: 1 island platform
- Tracks: 2
- Connections: PRT: 19L at Penn Av/Stanwix St. PRT: 28X (to West Busway/Airport) at Liberty Av/Stanwix St. PRT: G2 at Liberty Av/Stanwix St. PRT: O1 , O5 , O12 at Penn Av/Stanwix St. PRT: P7 , P10 , P17 , P69 , P76 , P78 at Liberty Av/Wyndham Grand

Construction
- Structure type: Underground
- Accessible: Yes

History
- Opened: July 3, 1985 (old station); March 25, 2012 (new station)
- Closed: October 30, 2009 (old station)
- Rebuilt: 2012
- Former names: Gateway Center (1985–2009)

Passengers
- 2020: 5,357 (weekday boardings)

Services
Preceding station	Pittsburgh Regional Transit	Following station
North Side toward Allegheny	Blue Line	Wood Street toward South Hills Village
North Side toward Allegheny	Red Line	Wood Street toward South Hills Village
North Side toward Allegheny	Silver Line	Wood Street toward Library
Former services
Preceding station	Port Authority of Allegheny County	Following station
Terminus	Brown Line	Wood Street toward South Hills Junction
Terminus	47D Drake 1984–1993	Wood Street toward Drake
Preceding station	Pittsburgh Regional Transit	Following station
North Side toward Allegheny	Subway Local Temporary	Wood Street toward Station Square
Location

Gateway station is a station on the Pittsburgh Light Rail system in Downtown Pittsburgh, operated by Pittsburgh Regional Transit. The station is located within the system's free fare zone, which also includes First Avenue, Steel Plaza, Wood Street, North Side, and Allegheny.

Until October 30, 2009, it was the terminal station for the light rail system. The station was closed as part of construction work on the North Shore Connector project, and a new station opened in 2012 (though its name was truncated from "Gateway Center" to simply "Gateway"). The former station entrance was demolished and a new station was built. Gateway station and North Side station lie at the southern and northern ends of the Allegheny River Tunnel, respectively.

== History ==
Gateway Center station was opened on July 3, 1985 as part of the new subway system that replaced the remaining downtown street running trolleys. Named for Gateway Center, the adjacent office complex, the station served the western portion of downtown. The stop also served major buildings such as One PPG Place and Fifth Avenue Place, the shopping and dining district at Market Square, and the historical and recreational hub of Point State Park.

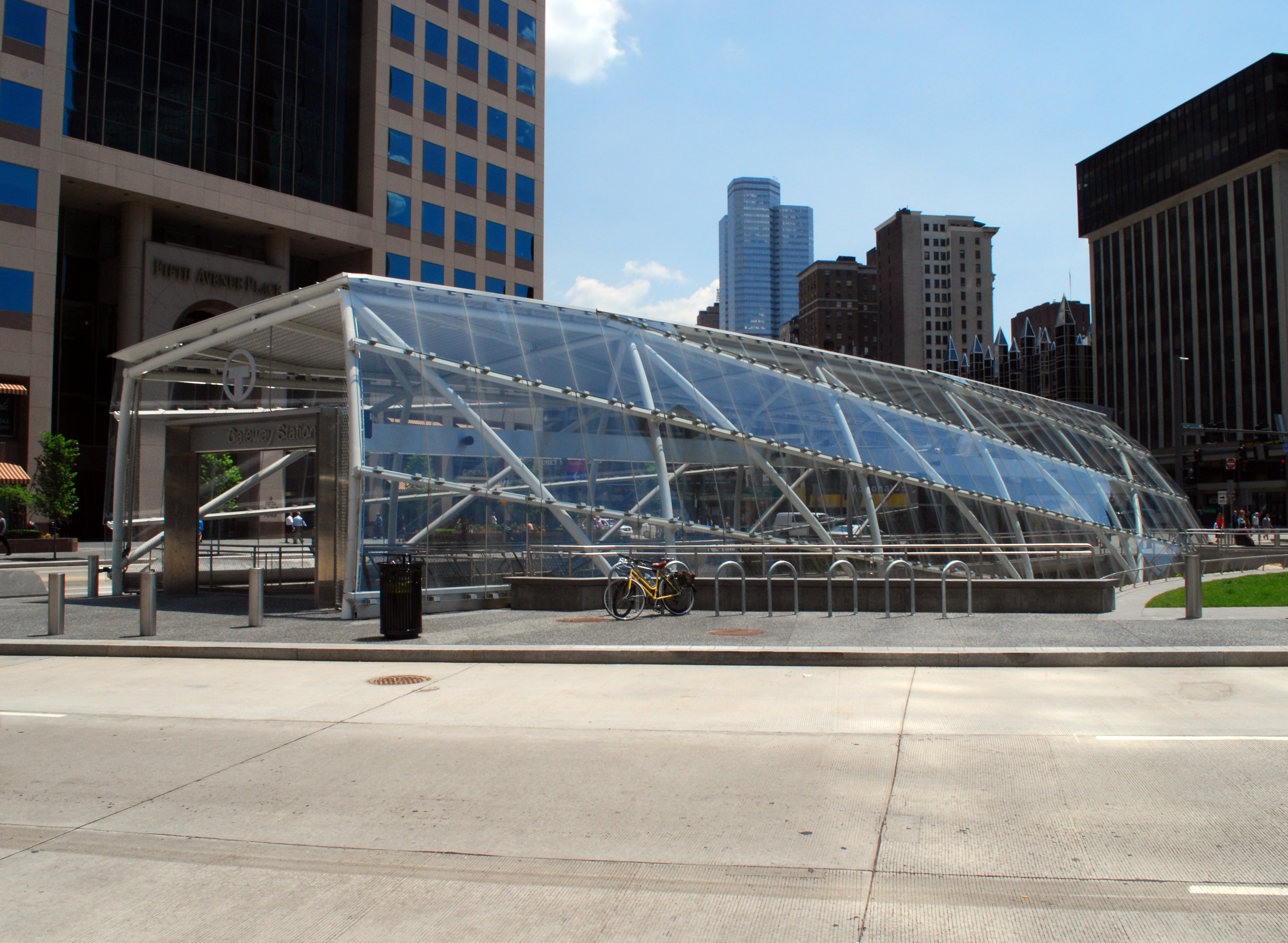
Station entrance

Gateway Center closed on October 30, 2009, as part of the North Shore Connector project, and a newly constructed station (named Gateway) opened just north of the original station on March 25, 2012. The original platform under Liberty Ave was left intact and abandoned, and can be seen while riding the train towards Wood Street.

The station features a mural by artist Romare Bearden. Commissioned by Pittsburgh Regional Transit as part of the original station complex, the mural is now valued at $15 million. The Heinz Endowments has pledged $250,000 toward the costs of removal and refurbishment. The mural was removed when the station was demolished, but was reinstalled in the new station. The original mural had one tile which had accidentally been placed upside-down, and the reinstallation of the mural faithfully reproduced this error.

== See also ==
- Gateway Center (Pittsburgh)
- Wabash Pittsburgh Terminal (former train station)
