= North Side station (Pittsburgh) =

Pittsburgh light rail station

North Side
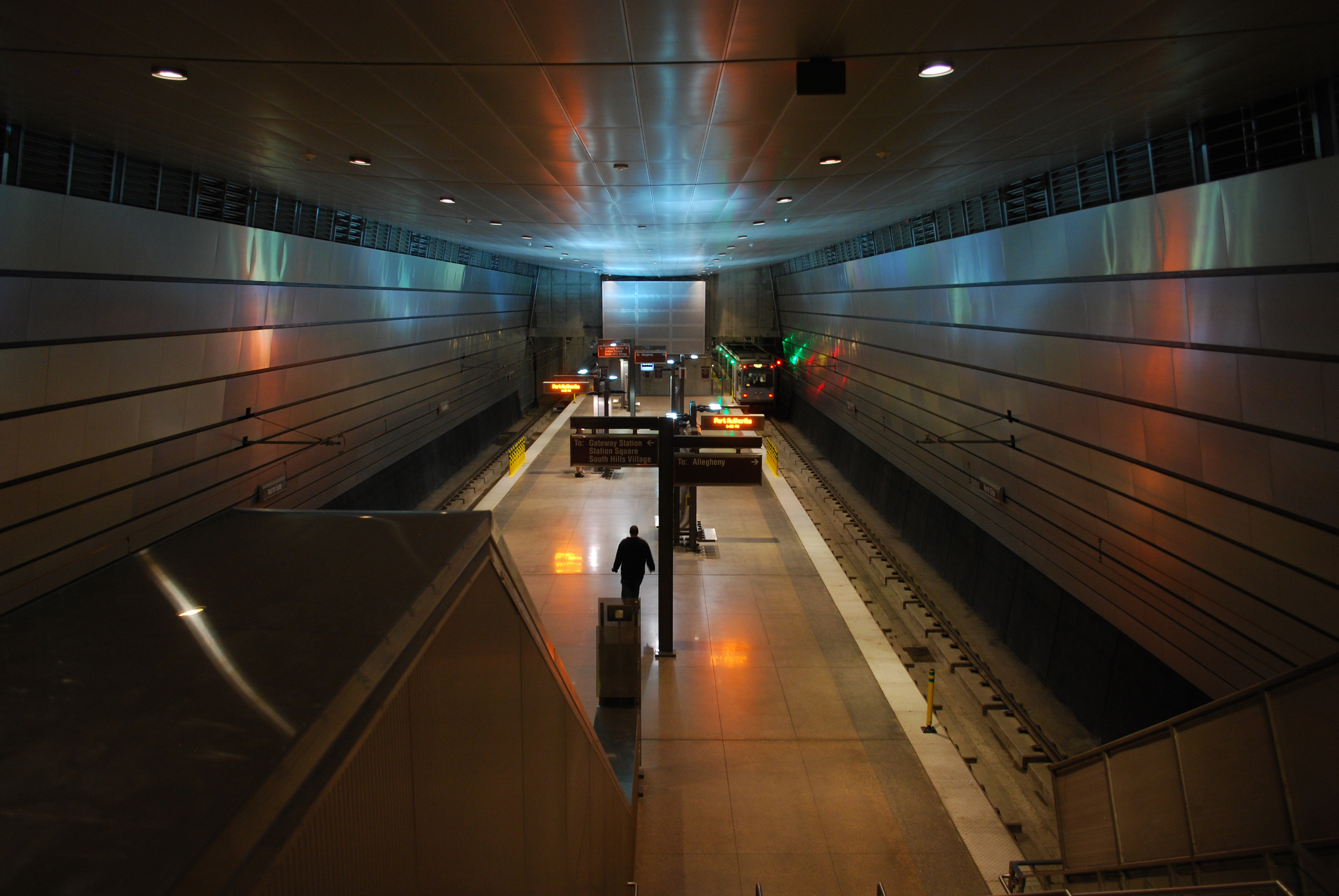

General information
- Location: West General Robinson Street and Mazeroski Way; Pittsburgh, Pennsylvania
- Coordinates: 40.4480°N 80.0093°W
- Owner: Pittsburgh Regional Transit
- Line: North Shore Connector
- Platforms: 1 island platform
- Tracks: 2

Construction
- Structure type: Underground
- Accessible: Yes

History
- Opened: March 25, 2012

Passengers
- 2020: 4,127 (weekday boardings)

Services
Preceding station	Pittsburgh Regional Transit	Following station
Allegheny Terminus	Blue Line	Gateway toward South Hills Village
Allegheny Terminus	Red Line	Gateway toward South Hills Village
Allegheny Terminus	Silver Line	Gateway toward Library
Former services
Preceding station	Pittsburgh Regional Transit	Following station
Allegheny Terminus	Subway Local Temporary	Gateway toward Station Square
Location

North Side station is a station on the Pittsburgh Light Rail system operated by Pittsburgh Regional Transit in the North Shore neighborhood of in Pittsburgh, Pennsylvania. The station is located within the system's free fare zone, which also includes First Avenue, Steel Plaza, Wood Street, Gateway, and Allegheny.

Among the locations within walking distance are: PNC Park, the Pittsburgh Pirates baseball stadium; the Andy Warhol Museum; the Carnegie Science Center; the Children's Museum of Pittsburgh; the National Aviary; and Allegheny Center.

North Side station and Gateway station lie at the northern and southern ends of the Allegheny River Tunnel, respectively.
