= Steel Plaza station =

Light rail station in Pittsburgh, PA

Steel Plaza
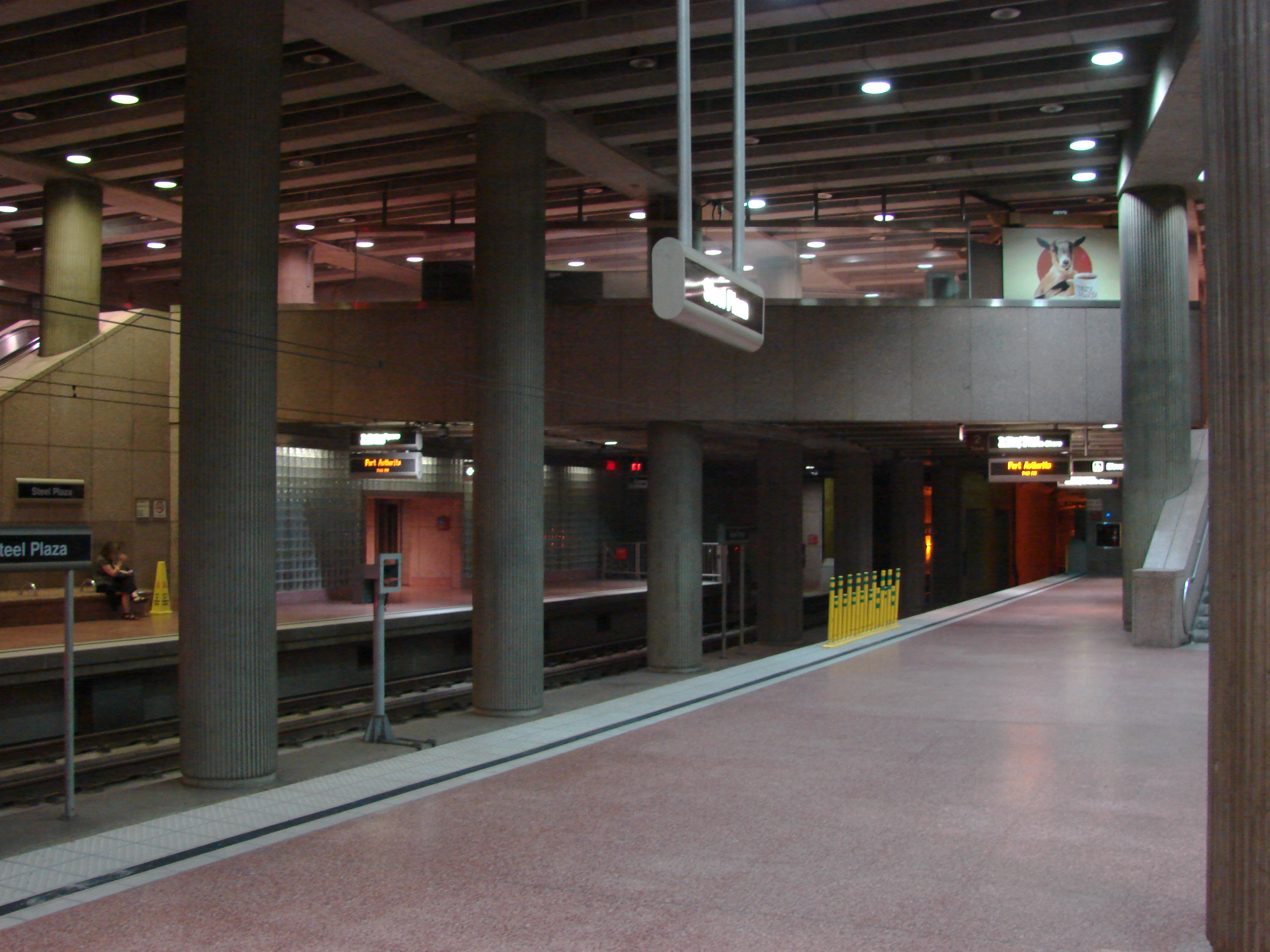
- Station platform

General information
- Location: Sixth Avenue and Grant Street; Pittsburgh, Pennsylvania
- Coordinates: 40.4411°N 79.9966°W
- Owner: Pittsburgh Regional Transit
- Line: Downtown subway
- Platforms: 2 side platforms, 1 island platform
- Tracks: 4
- Connections: PRT: 61A, 61B, 61C, 71B, 81, 82, 83; PRT: G2 at Steel Plaza PRTX

Construction
- Structure type: Underground
- Accessible: Yes

History
- Opened: July 3, 1985

Passengers
- 2020: 4,674 (weekday boardings)

Services
| Preceding station | Pittsburgh Regional Transit | Following station |
|---|---|---|
| Wood Street toward Allegheny | Blue Line | First Avenue toward South Hills Village |
| Wood Street toward Allegheny | Red Line | First Avenue toward South Hills Village |
| Wood Street toward Allegheny | Silver Line | First Avenue toward Library |
| Penn Station Terminus | Shuttle (special events only) | Terminus |
Former services
| Preceding station | Port Authority of Allegheny County | Following station |
|---|---|---|
| Wood Street toward Gateway | Brown Line | First Avenue toward South Hills Junction |
| Penn Station Rush hour service Terminus | 42 South Hills Village via Beechview | First Avenue toward South Hills Village |
| Wood Street toward Gateway | 47D Drake 1984–1993 | Station Square toward Drake |
| Preceding station | Pittsburgh Regional Transit | Following station |
| Wood Street toward Allegheny | Subway Local | First Avenue toward Station Square |
Location

Steel Plaza station is a station on the Pittsburgh Light Rail system in Downtown Pittsburgh, operated by Pittsburgh Regional Transit. The station is located within the system's free fare zone, which also includes First Avenue, Wood Street, Gateway, North Side, and Allegheny.

It is located at the intersection of Grant Street and Oliver Avenue. The station consists of an outbound (southbound) side platform and an inbound island platform, with one track for trains to Wood Street and the other for a disused branch line to Union Station. The station has rights to 4.25 acres underground Mellon Green and is accessible by means of a tunnel that connects BNY Mellon Center and the US Steel Tower. It is also the closest station to PPG Paints Arena and the primary station used for the Pittsburgh Penguins' home games.

The busiest station in the system, in addition to being directly connected to BNY Mellon Center and the U.S. Steel Tower, it provides access to eastern and central portions of downtown. Major office buildings including the Gulf Tower, 525 William Penn Place, and the Koppers Building are also only a block away, along with the many early 20th-century skyscrapers that make up downtown's inner core. The city's Uptown (commonly known as The Bluff) neighborhood and Duquesne University is also within a short walk.

== History ==
The station is located in what was originally the Pittsburgh & Steubenville Extension Railroad Tunnel, which was opened in 1865.

In 1984, Jane Haskell's work "Rivers of Light" was installed.

The station also features low-level platforms, which were used by modernized PCC cars from 1985 until 1993. These trolleys were used for the 47 Shannon and 47D Drake routes, and were cut off from the downtown light rail tunnels in 1993 when the original Overbrook line was closed for rehabilitation. The low-level platforms exist to this day but are gated off.

== Fare collection ==
There is no fare collection in the Steel Plaza Station. Passengers embarking at Steel Plaza may travel free to any of the other stations in the free fare zone–First Avenue, Wood Street, Gateway Center, North Side, and Allegheny. Outbound passengers pay fares when disembarking.
