= First Avenue station =

First Avenue station could refer to:

- First Avenue (BMT Canarsie Line), a subway station in New York City
- First Avenue station (PAAC), a light rail station in Pittsburgh, Pennsylvania
- First Avenue station (Tianjin Metro), a TEDA Modern Guided Rail Tram station in Tianjin, China
