= Allegheny station (Pittsburgh) =

Light rail station in Pittsburgh, PA

Allegheny
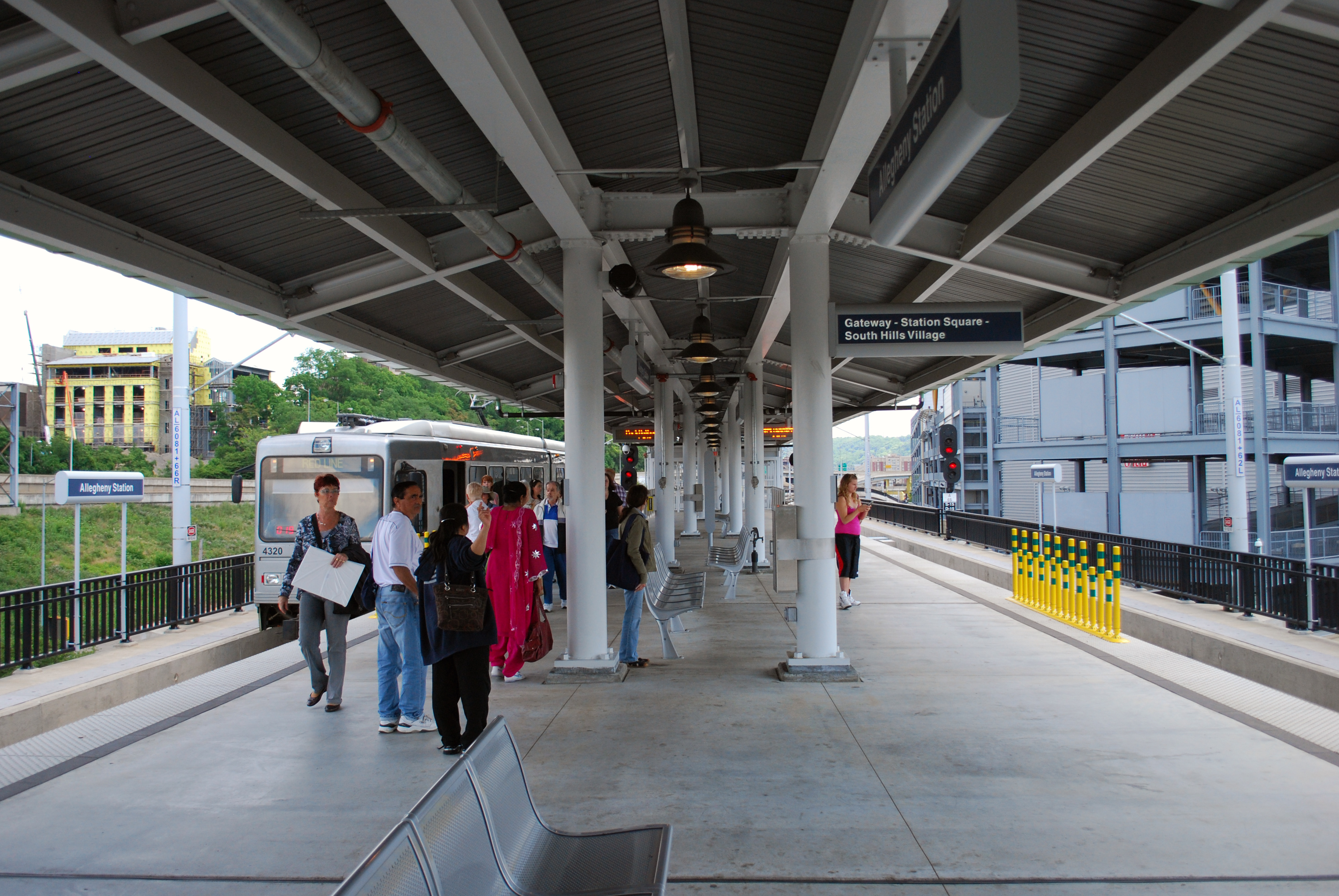
- Allegheny station platform, June 2012

General information
- Location: Allegheny Avenue and Reedsdale Street; Pittsburgh, Pennsylvania
- Coordinates: 40.4479°N 80.0178°W
- Owner: Pittsburgh Regional Transit
- Line: North Shore Connector
- Platforms: 1 island platform
- Tracks: 2
- Connections: Pittsburgh Regional Transit: 14, 18, 54

Construction
- Structure type: Elevated
- Accessible: Yes

History
- Opened: March 25, 2012

Passengers
- 2020: 3,743 (weekday boardings)

Services
Preceding station	Pittsburgh Regional Transit	Following station
Terminus	Blue Line	North Side toward South Hills Village
Terminus	Red Line	North Side toward South Hills Village
Terminus	Silver Line	North Side toward Library
Former services
Preceding station	Pittsburgh Regional Transit	Following station
Terminus	Subway Local Temporary	North Side toward Station Square
Location

Allegheny station is a station on the Pittsburgh Light Rail system operated by Pittsburgh Regional Transit in the North Shore neighborhood of in Pittsburgh, Pennsylvania. The station is located within the system's free fare zone, which also includes First Avenue, Steel Plaza, Wood Street, Gateway, and North Side.

Among the locations within walking distance are: Acrisure Stadium (home of the Pittsburgh Steelers and Pittsburgh Panthers), Rivers Casino, the Stage AE amphitheater, Community College of Allegheny County's Allegheny Campus, and Kamin Science Center.

This station currently acts as the northern terminus of the Pittsburgh Light Rail system, and it is most distant station of the North Shore Connector project. It also marks the beginning of the Light Rail system's six-station "Free Fare Zone" within which riders do not need to pay to ride.

Bus bays are located under the elevated station.

== Future developments ==
Although Allegheny station is currently a terminus, in the future, Pittsburgh Regional Transit plans to extend service westward toward Pittsburgh International Airport as well as northward into the North Hills area.
