= Downtown Pittsburgh =

Downtown Central Business District; Golden Triangle
- Neighborhood
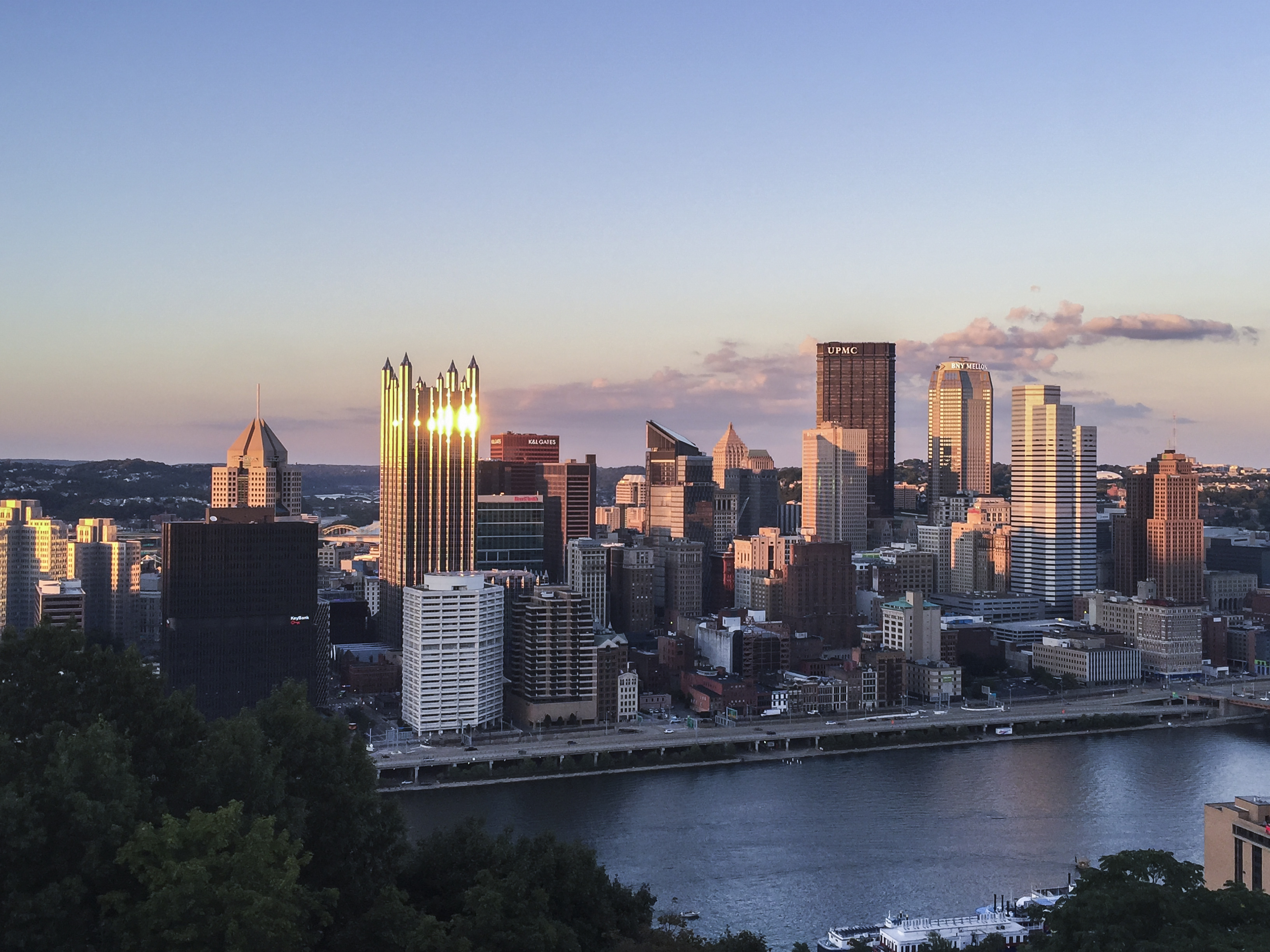
- Downtown Pittsburgh as seen from Mount Washington

- Location of Downtown Pittsburgh in Pittsburgh
- Coordinates: 40°26′28″N 80°00′00″W
- Country: United States
- State: Pennsylvania
- County: Allegheny County
- City: Pittsburgh

Area
  - Total: 0.64 sq mi (1.7 km^{2})

Population (2020)
  - Total: 5,477
  - Density: 8,600/sq mi (3,300/km^{2})

Downtown Pittsburgh, colloquially referred to as the Golden Triangle, and officially the Central Business District, is the urban downtown center of Pittsburgh, Pennsylvania, United States. It is located at the confluence of the Allegheny River and the Monongahela River whose joining forms the Ohio River. The triangle is bounded by the two rivers.

The area features offices for major corporations such as PNC Bank, U.S. Steel, PPG, Bank of New York Mellon, Heinz, Federated Investors, and Alcoa. It is where the fortunes of such industrial barons as Andrew Carnegie, Henry Clay Frick, Henry J. Heinz, Andrew Mellon and George Westinghouse were made. It contains the site where the French fort, Fort Duquesne, once stood.

Historical population
Year	Pop.	±%
1940	7,864	—
1950	7,517	−4.4%
1960	2,211	−70.6%
1970	3,679	+66.4%
1980	3,220	−12.5%
1990	3,785	+17.5%
2000	2,721	−28.1%
2010	3,629	+33.4%
2020	5,477	+50.9%
Source: University of Pittsburgh

== Location ==
The Central Business District is bounded by the Monongahela River to the south, the Allegheny River to the north, and I-579 (Crosstown Boulevard) to the east. An expanded definition of Downtown may include the adjacent neighborhoods of Uptown/The Bluff, the Strip District, the North Shore, and the South Shore.

== Transportation ==
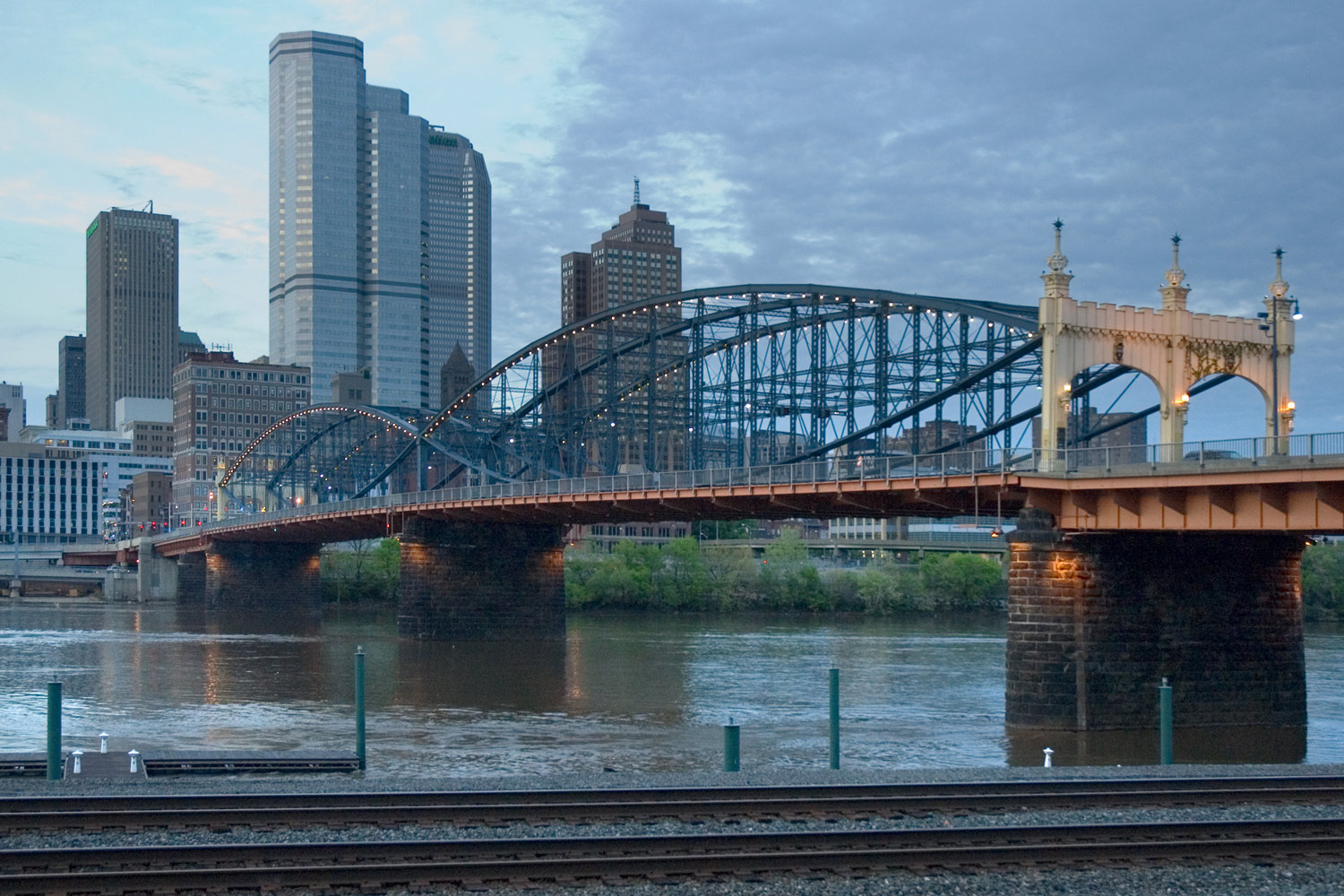
The Smithfield Street Bridge

Famed mural on the 300 Sixth Avenue building

=== Public transportation ===
Downtown is served by Pittsburgh Regional Transit's Pittsburgh Light Rail system (known locally as the "T") and an extensive bus network. The Downtown portion of the subway has the following stations:

- First Avenue near First Avenue and Ross Street (elevated)
- Steel Plaza at Sixth Avenue and Grant Street (underground)
- Wood Street at the triangular intersection of Wood Street, Sixth Avenue and Liberty Avenue (underground)
- Gateway at Liberty Avenue and Stanwix Street (underground)

Downtown is also home to the Pittsburgh Amtrak train station connecting Pittsburgh with New York City, Philadelphia, and Washington, D.C. to the east and Cleveland and Chicago to the west. Greyhound's Pittsburgh bus terminal is located across Liberty Avenue from the Amtrak Station, in the Grant Street Transportation Center building.

=== Highways ===
Major roadways serving Downtown from the suburbs include the "Parkway East" (I-376) from Monroeville, the "Parkway West" (I-376) from the airport area, and the "Parkway North" (I-279) from the North Hills, and (I-579) in Downtown Pittsburgh. Other important roadways are Pennsylvania Route 28, Pennsylvania Route 51, Pennsylvania Route 65, and U.S. Route 19.

Three major entrances to the city are via tunnels: the Fort Pitt Tunnel and Squirrel Hill Tunnel on I-376 and the Liberty Tunnels. The New York Times once called Pittsburgh "the only city with an entrance," specifically referring to the view of Downtown that explodes upon drivers immediately upon exiting the Fort Pitt Tunnel. Also traveling I-279 south and I-376, the city "explodes into view" when coming around a turn in the highway.

=== Local streets ===
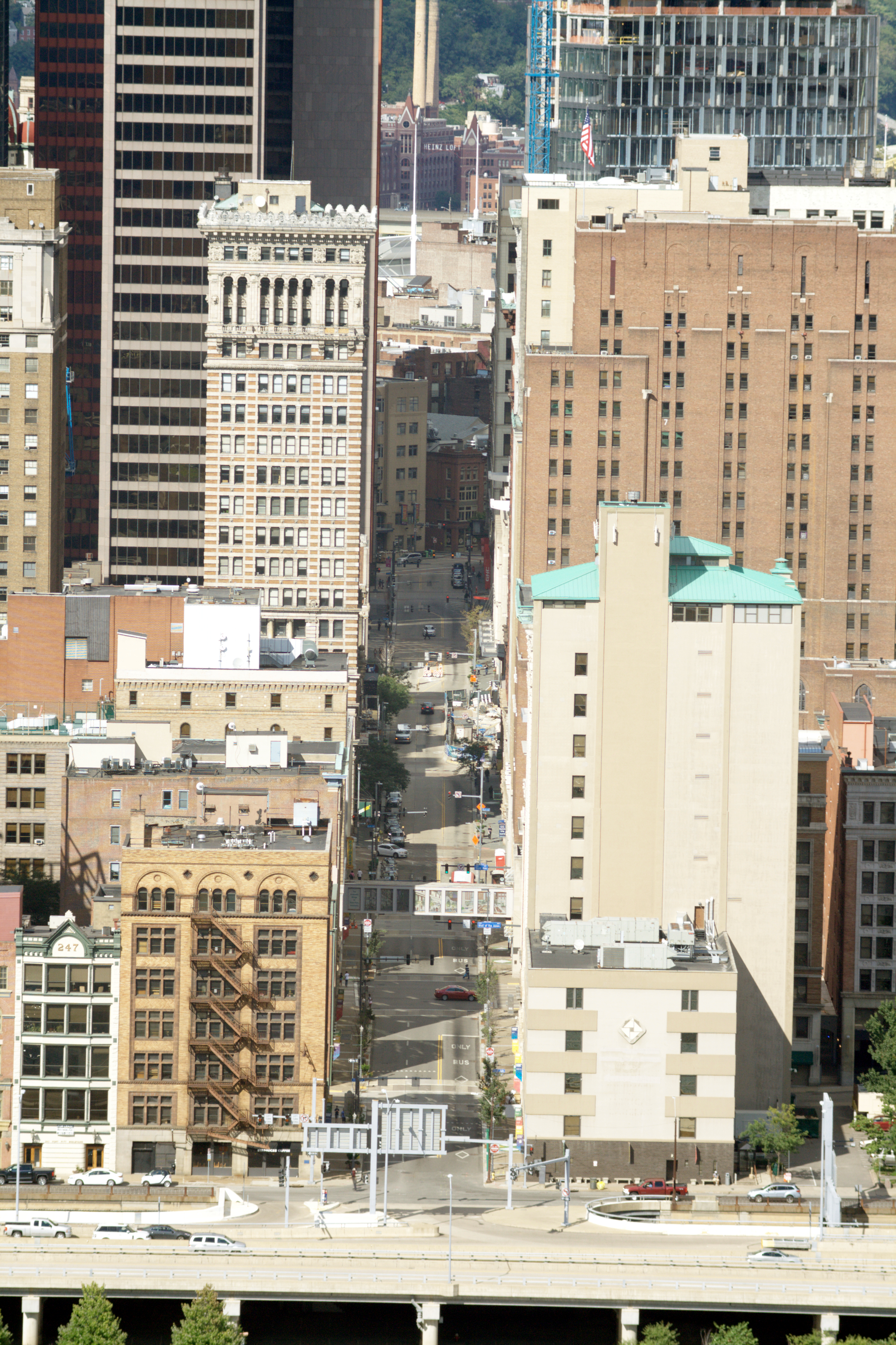
Wood Street

Downtown surface streets are based on two distinct grid systems that parallel the Allegheny and Monongahela rivers. These two grids intersect along Liberty Avenue, creating many unusual street intersections. Furthermore, the Allegheny grid contains numbered streets, while the Monongahela grid contains numbered avenues. And, in fact, there are cases where these numbered roadways intersect, creating some confusion (i.e. the intersection of Liberty Avenue and 7th Street/6th Avenue). This unusual grid pattern leads to Pittsburghers giving directions in the terms of landmarks, rather than turn-by-turn directions.

=== Bridges ===
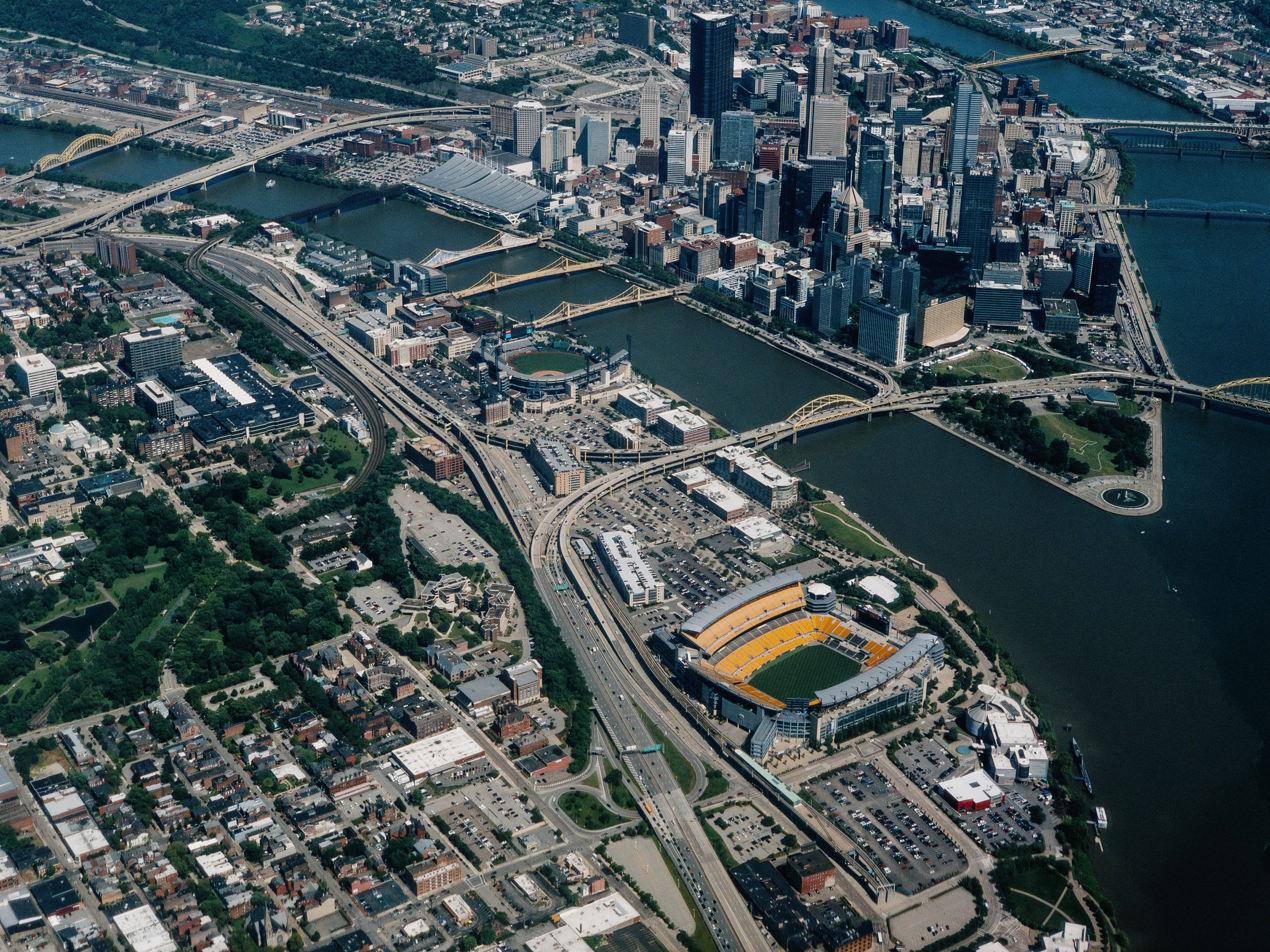
Aerial photo of Downtown Pittsburgh and all of the connecting bridges in 2019

Pittsburgh is nicknamed "The City of Bridges". In Downtown, there are 10 bridges (listed below) connecting to points north and south. The expanded definition of Downtown (including the aforementioned surrounding neighborhoods) includes 18 bridges. Citywide there are 446 bridges. In Allegheny County the number exceeds 2,200.

Downtown Bridges

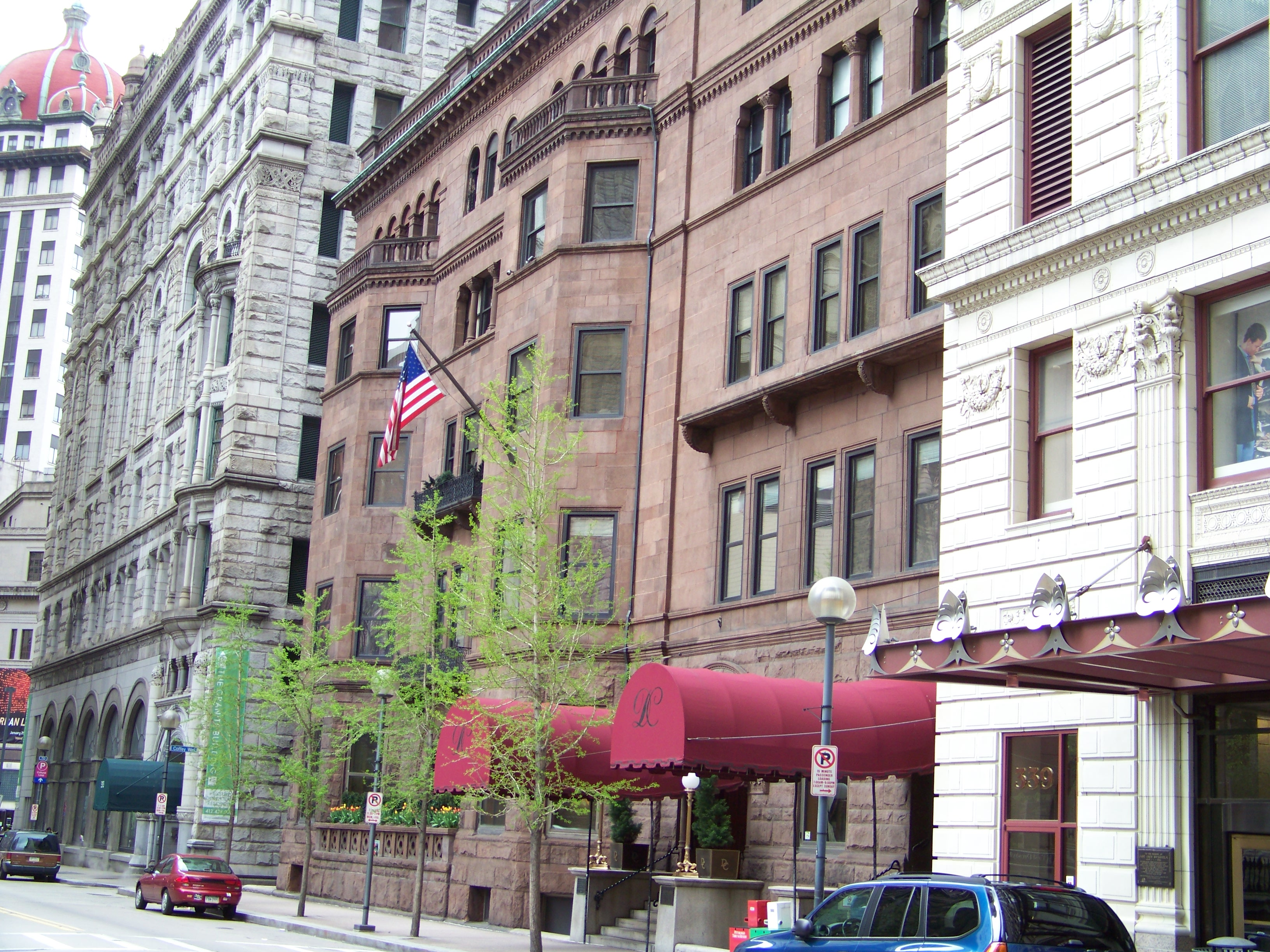
Sixth Avenue in Downtown Pittsburgh

- Fort Pitt Bridge carries I-376 (Previously I-279) between Downtown and the Fort Pitt Tunnel
- Fort Duquesne Bridge carries I-279 between Downtown and the North Shore
- Smithfield Street Bridge carries Smithfield Street between Downtown and the South Shore
- Panhandle Bridge carries the city's light rail transit system between Downtown and the South Shore
- Liberty Bridge connects the Liberty Tunnel to I-579 Downtown
- Fort Wayne Railroad Bridge carries freight and Amtrak trains from Downtown to the North Shore
- Veterans Bridge carries I-579 from Downtown to the North Side
- Three Sisters Bridges
  - Roberto Clemente Bridge (formerly 6th St Bridge) connects 6th Street Downtown to Federal Street on the North Shore at PNC Park
  - Andy Warhol Bridge (formerly 7th St Bridge) connects 7th Street Downtown to Sandusky Street on the North Shore at the Andy Warhol Museum
  - Rachel Carson Bridge (formerly 9th St Bridge) connects 9th Street Downtown to Anderson Street on the North Shore

Bridges of Expanded Downtown

- West End Bridge carries US Route 19 from the West End/South Shore to the North Shore/North Side just west of Downtown
- 16th Street Bridge carries 16th Street from the Strip District to Chestnut Street on the North Side
- West Penn Bridge (pedestrian/bike-only) is part of the Three Rivers Heritage Trail connecting the North Side to Washington's Landing on Herr's Island
- 30th Street Bridge connects River Avenue on the North Side with Waterfront Drive on Washington's Landing at Herr's Island
- 31st Street Bridge connects PA Route 28 on the North Side with 31st Street in the Strip District
- 33rd Street Railroad Bridge connects the North Side to the Strip District and crosses Herr's Island
- South 10th Street Bridge connects the Armstrong Tunnel at Second Avenue just east of Downtown with the South Side at South 10th Street
- Birmingham Bridge connects East Carson Street on the South Side with Fifth and Forbes avenues in Uptown

== Downtown districts ==
Downtown contains a wealth of historic, cultural, and entertainment sites. While most people still consider the entire Downtown as one neighborhood, there are several significant subdistricts within the Golden Triangle.

- The Pittsburgh Central Downtown Historic District is a historic district in the central business district. It is bounded by Wood Street, Forbes Avenue, Grant Street, and Liberty Avenue. It was listed on the National Register of Historic Places (NRHP) on December 17, 1985.
- Point State Park area: At the triangle's tip is Point State Park with its giant fountain and the Fort Pitt Museum. This park was the original site of both Fort Duquesne by the French and the subsequent Fort Pitt by the British.
- The Cultural District along Penn and Liberty avenues on the Allegheny River includes numerous theaters, galleries, and concert halls including Heinz Hall, Byham Theater, O'Reilly Theater, Benedum Center, and Wood Street Galleries as well as restaurants and housing. The Penn-Liberty Historic District encompasses the Penn & Liberty avenue corridor in the Cultural District.
- The Fifth & Forbes Corridor is Downtown's shopping district along Fifth and Forbes avenues and includes historic Market Square. Downtown is home to numerous independent retailers plus large retailers such as Burlington Coat Factory and Brooks Brothers.
- The Grant Street area is the seat of Pittsburgh's and Allegheny County's government and is also a prestigious corporate address with many of the city's tallest skyscrapers.
- The Firstside neighborhood along the Boulevard of the Allies and Fort Pitt Boulevard adjacent to the Monongahela River is an educational and residential district. It is home to Point Park University and the Art Institute of Pittsburgh both of which have high-rise student housing in the neighborhood. Numerous other residential projects are also under construction in this neighborhood.

== Economy ==
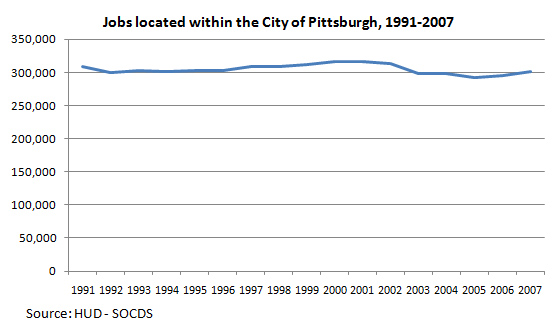
Pittsburgh's number of jobs is generally stable.

Downtown Pittsburgh retains substantial economic influence, ranking at 25th in the nation for jobs within the urban core and 6th in job density.

University of Pittsburgh economist Christopher Briem notes that the level of employment in the city has remained largely constant for the past 50 years: "[the] time series of jobs located in the City proper are about as stable as any economic metric in the region, or in any other Northeastern US urban core, over many decades. In 1958, [there were] 294,000 jobs located in the city proper...Those numbers are virtually identical today which tells me there is a certain limit to how many jobs can efficiently be located in what are some relatively (very) constrained areas." These numbers reflect employment in the city as a whole, not just the central business district; but the central business district has the highest density of employment of any Pittsburgh neighborhood.

Pittsburgh has long been a headquarters city, with numerous national and global corporations calling the Golden Triangle home. Currently, Downtown is still home to a large number of Fortune 500 companies (7 in the metro area, 5 of which are in the city in 2022, which ranks Pittsburgh high nationally in Fortune 500 headquarters):

- Kraft Heinz

– co-headquartered in PPG Place

- PNC Financial Services

– headquartered in the Tower at PNC Plaza

- PPG Industries

– headquartered in PPG Place

- WESCO International

– headquartered at Station Square

- U.S. Steel

– headquartered at the US Steel Tower

Downtown is also home to GNC, Dollar Bank, Equitable Resources, Duquesne Light, Federated Investors and Highmark as well as the regional headquarters for Citizens Bank, Ariba, and Dominion Resources. Regional healthcare giant UPMC has its corporate headquarters in the US Steel Tower.

== Major buildings ==
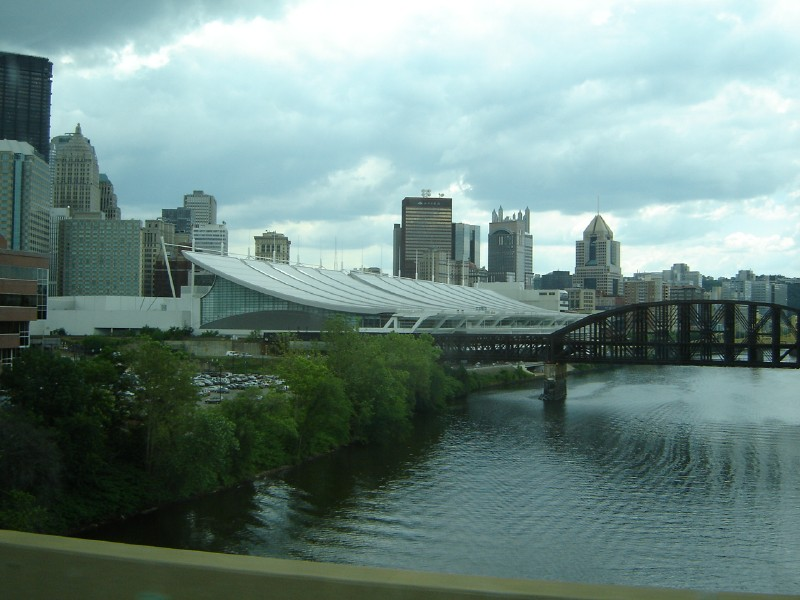
The sweeping roofline of the David L. Lawrence Convention Center on the Allegheny River

- 11 Stanwix Street
- 525 William Penn Place
- Allegheny County Courthouse
- Benedum Center
- BNY Mellon Center
- Byham Theater
- City-County Building
- David L. Lawrence Convention Center
- EQT Plaza
- Heinz Hall
- Fifth Avenue Place
- Federated Tower
- First Presbyterian Church of Pittsburgh
- Frick Building
- Gateway Center
- Grant Building
- Gulf Tower
- K&L Gates Center
- Koppers Tower
- O'Reilly Theater
- Oxford Centre
- Penn Station
- One PNC Plaza
- Two PNC Plaza
- Three PNC Plaza
- Trinity Cathedral, downtown
- PPG Place
- Regional Enterprise Tower
- Union Trust Building
- US Steel Tower
- William S. Moorhead Federal Building

== Parks and plazas ==
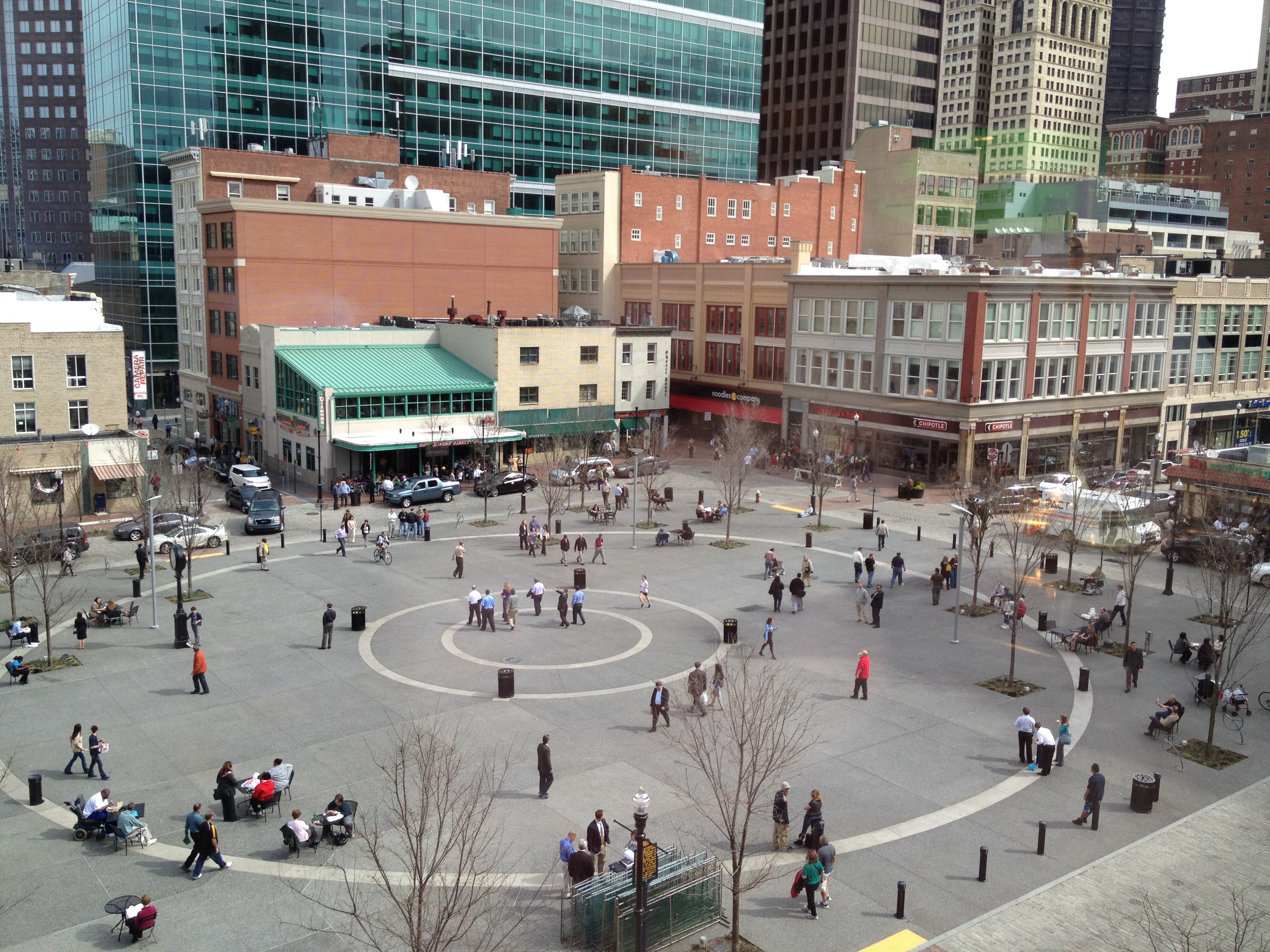
Market Square

Downtown is home to numerous parks, large and small:

- Point State Park at the tip of the Golden Triangle
- Mellon Square located in the square between Oliver & Sixth avenues and Smithfield Street and William Penn Place
- Market Square at Forbes Avenue & Market Street
- Mellon Green located at Grant Street & Sixth Avenue
- FirstSide Park located between Grant & Ross streets and First & Second avenues.
- Gateway Center plazas located around the Gateway Center skyscrapers near Liberty Avenue & Stanwix Street
- Plaza at PPG Place near Third Avenue & Market Street
- US Steel Tower Plaza at Grant Street & Sixth Avenue
- Katz Plaza at Penn Avenue & Seventh Street
- Triangle Park bounded by Liberty Avenue, Fifth Avenue & Market Street
- Allegheny Riverfront Park along the Allegheny River below Fort Duquesne Boulevard
- Mon Wharf Landing along the Monongahela River below Fort Pitt Boulevard (under construction)
- North Shore Riverfront Park opposite Downtown along the Allegheny and Ohio rivers, part of the larger Three Rivers Park

== Educational facilities ==
While Pittsburgh's Oakland neighborhood is known as the educational center of the city, Downtown is home to several higher education institutions as well as a branch of the city's Carnegie Library system and a Pittsburgh Public Schools 6–12 school:

- Point Park University
- Pittsburgh Creative and Performing Arts 6–12
- City Charter High School

== Residential areas ==
Downtown has several condos, including Gateway Towers and Chatham Place dating to the 1960s and more modern structures as well. There are over 5,000 apartment and condo units in Greater Downtown Pittsburgh.

== Surrounding neighborhoods ==
- The Bluff/Uptown
- Crawford-Roberts neighborhood in the Hill District
- North Shore (across the Allegheny River)
- South Shore (across the Monongahela River)
- South Side Flats (across the Monongahela River)
- Strip District

== See also ==
- List of Pittsburgh neighborhoods
