= Jane Haskell =

American artist and philanthropist

Jane Haskell (24 November 1923 – 28 May 2013) was a Pittsburgh-based artist and philanthropist whose art focused on light. Her neon work "River of Light" was installed in the Steel Plaza station of Pittsburgh's 'T' system in 1984, which was commissioned by the Pittsburgh Cultural Trust. She became a member of the Carnegie Museum of Art board in 1999, and was chosen as the 2006 Artist of the Year and exhibited by the Pittsburgh Center for the Arts. She was a student of Samuel Rosenberg and her work was exhibited as Jane Haskell: Drawing in Light at the American Jewish Museum. "Born Jane Zirinsky in 1923, in Cedarhurst, Long Island, N.Y., Haskell received a bachelor of fine arts from Skidmore College in 1944 and earned a masters in art history from the University of Pittsburgh in 1961."
