= U.S. Steel Tower =

Skyscraper in Pittsburgh, Pennsylvania

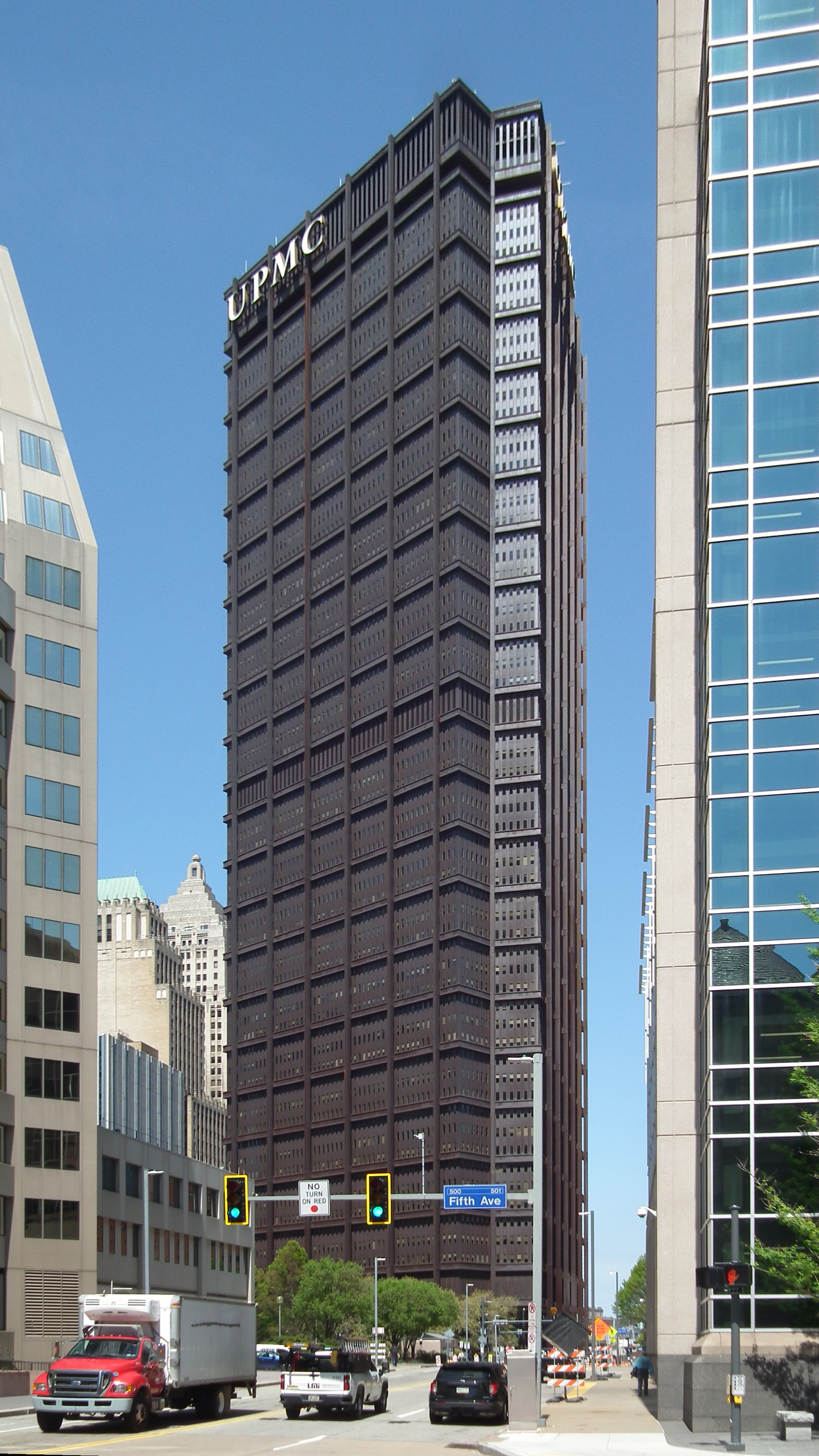
- U.S. Steel Tower in 2025
- Interactive map of the U.S. Steel Tower area
- Former names: USX Tower (1988–2001)

Record height
- Tallest in Pennsylvania from 1971 to 1984^{[I]}
- Preceded by: Gulf Tower
- Surpassed by: Liberty Place

General information
- Type: Commercial offices (Authorized commercial offices)
- Location: 600 Grant Street; Pittsburgh, Pennsylvania
- Coordinates: 40.4413°N 79.9947°W
- Construction started: March 15, 1967
- Completed: 1970
- Opening: September 30, 1971
- Cost: $50 million+ ($496.2 million+ today)
- Owner: The 601W Companies
- Operator: Winthrop Management

Height
- Roof: 841.0 ft (256.34 m)

Technical details
- Floor count: 64
- Floor area: 2,336,253 sq ft (217,045.0 m^{2})
- Lifts/elevators: 54 – six banks of eight passenger elevators, four freight and two private elevators

Design and construction
- Architect: Harrison, Abramovitz & Abbe
- Structural engineer: Leslie E. Robertson Associates
- Main contractor: Turner Construction

Other information
- Public transit: Steel Plaza

Website
- ussteeltower.com

The U.S. Steel Tower, also known as the Steel Building, or USX Tower (1988–2001), is a 64-story skyscraper at 600 Grant Street in downtown Pittsburgh, Pennsylvania. The interior has 2,300,000 sq ft (210,000 m^{2}) of leasable space. At 841 feet (256.3 m) tall, it is the tallest building in Pittsburgh. It held its opening dedication on September 30, 1971.

The tower's original name when completed was the "U.S. Steel Tower" and was changed to "USX Tower" in 1988. The name was changed back to the "U.S. Steel Tower" in January 2002 to reflect U.S. Steel's new corporate identity (USX was the 1990s combined oil/energy/steel conglomerate). Although no longer the owner of the building, U.S. Steel remains one of the largest tenants.

== History ==
Prior to 1970, the tallest building in Pittsburgh at 44 stories was the Gulf Building (now known as the Gulf Tower). In the planning stages, U.S. Steel executives considered making the building the world's tallest, but settled on 840 ft (260 m), making it the tallest building outside New York and Chicago. However, it eventually lost even that distinction to newer buildings erected across the United States.

The building contains over 44,000 U.S. tons (40,000 metric tons) of structural steel, and almost an acre of office space per floor. The U.S. Steel Tower is architecturally noted for its triangular shape with indented corners. The building also made history by being the first to use liquid-filled fireproofed columns. U.S. Steel deliberately placed the massive steel columns on the exterior of the building to showcase a new product called Cor-ten steel. Cor-ten resists the corrosive effects of rain, snow, ice, fog, and other meteorological conditions by forming a coating of dark brown oxidation over the metal, which inhibits deeper penetration and doesn't need painting and costly rust-prevention maintenance over the years. The initial weathering of the material resulted in a discoloration of the surrounding city sidewalks, as well as other nearby buildings. A cleanup effort was orchestrated by the corporation once weathering was complete to undo this damage, but the sidewalks still have a rusty tinge. The Cor-Ten steel for the building was made at the former U.S. Steel Homestead Works.

Rockwell International, which had its headquarters in the building, displayed a large model of the Rockwell-designed NASA Space Shuttle in the building's lobby until the company moved its headquarters to Southern California in 1988.

In May 1986, two men parachuted off the roof of the tower before being arrested by Pittsburgh Police near the Civic Arena.

In 2014, US Steel announced its intention to build new office space at the adjacent site of the former Civic Arena.

The largest occupancy by a tenant of the building is held by UPMC, which leases 500,000 square feet (46,000 m^{2}) of office space within the tower. In 2008, UPMC added signage, lights displaying "UPMC," to the top of the tower for the first time in its history, a move that was criticized by some involved in the construction of the structure.

== Features ==
=== Water filled columns ===
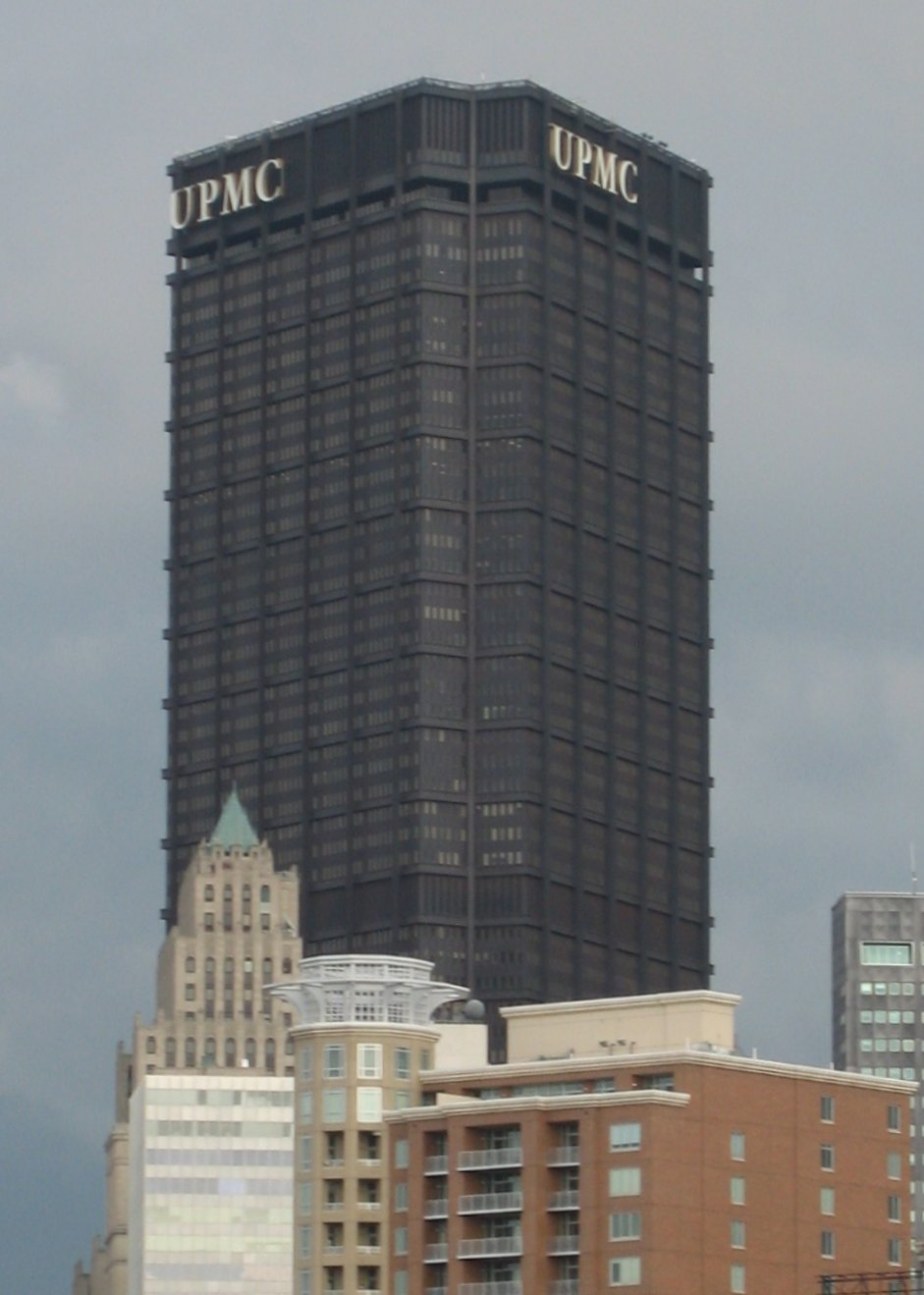
Another view of the U.S. Steel Tower with the University of Pittsburgh Medical Center sign.

Although accepted for bridges, etc., exposing structural Cor-Ten in a building was not possible using standard construction methods because steel needed to be protected by concrete or an applied insulation to meet the fire-protection requirements of building codes. Fire protection was achieved for the 18 columns of this tower by making them hollow and filled with a water/antifreeze/rust inhibitor mixture, a technique patented in the 19th century.

=== LEED certification ===
In 2019, Winthrop Management, with the help of sustainability consulting firm evolveEA, achieved LEED Silver Certification for the US Steel Tower under the Existing Buildings: Operations + Maintenance rating system. The building is one of the largest LEED for O+M: Existing Buildings V4 office buildings in the world. Multiple LEED Certifications have been earned for the interior office spaces inside the tower as well.

=== Internal systems ===
The U.S. Steel Tower features several redundant systems that have allowed the building to remain free of unplanned service interruptions since it was constructed. It is fed by two redundant water mains, one from Grant Street and one from 7th Avenue. Both are fully maintained and tested annually. There is a fail over system in place, and either main will automatically meet the water demands of the building in the event of a failure. In addition, the building has four redundant water pumps, any one of which can meet the needs of the entire building. The building also has four redundant electrical feeds, which come from several substations. Finally, the building has fully redundant heating and cooling systems, including two boilers and two water cooled chillers. The heating boilers can burn either natural gas or No. 2 fuel oil. There is no fail over, but manual adjustment of the system in the event of a supply shortage takes only minutes.

=== Signage ===
The University of Pittsburgh Medical Center initially leased five floors of the tower, which now serves as the institution's headquarters. Although U.S. Steel was the largest tenant in the building at the time, to go along with this lease, the company also purchased new signs reading "UPMC" for the top of each three sides of the building. The Pittsburgh Planning Commission approved the 20-foot (6.1 m) signs. The signage cost $750,000, according to a document submitted in 2006 to the city planning commission.

Much deliberation surrounded the controversial issue of the sign in planning commission meetings. "U", "P", and a "C" were installed via helicopter on May 3–4, 2008, but weather conditions postponed completion, and the "M" was not installed until some time later. The sign was completed June 7–8, 2008. Illumination was provided several weeks after installation. Energy efficient LED lights replaced the neon bulbs used in the original sign in 2019.

=== Plaza and fountain ===
Next to the entrance of the building, there is a plaza and a fountain alongside a brewery named Brew Gentlemen. The area is known as "Steel Garden" There is also a bus stop right outside the plaza that serves the Martin Luther King Jr. East Busway.

=== Nativity scene ===
Each year, a nativity scene goes on display in the building's courtyard. It is larger than the original nativity, and is the only authorized replica of the Vatican's Christmas crèche in St. Peter's Square.

=== Roof ===
Unlike many buildings of similar heights, the U.S. Steel Tower does not taper in width from its lower floors to its higher floors. Accordingly, the tower sports the "largest roof in the world at its height or above", at a size of approximately one acre. This flat expanse was once used as a heliport, but it has sat dormant since 1992.

==== Top Of The Triangle ====
From shortly after the Tower's opening until 2001, the 62nd floor was home to Top of the Triangle, a fine dining restaurant that provided unequaled views of Pittsburgh and the surrounding region. Unable to negotiate new leasing terms, the restaurant closed after 30 years in business and was replaced with more office spaces.

==== High Point Park proposal ====
An organization known as the High Point Park Investigation was formed to explore the possibility of converting the dormant roof of the U.S. Steel Tower into an attraction of some sort—a "pinnacle of perspective where people go to see the view, a signature landmark like the Eiffel Tower or the Empire State Building". This transformation could take the form of a nature park, a gallery space, or some other type of attraction. The High Point Park Investigation is based at Carnegie Mellon University's STUDIO for Creative Inquiry and has received the endorsement of regional organizations including the Pittsburgh Parks Conservancy and VisitPittsburgh.com. As of January 2010, the building's owner had expressed no interest in developing the roof of the tower, but public interest in the potential of such a project has been high.

In March 2013 a group of architects and designers finished detailed plans for a glass covered 2 floor atrium at the top of the skyscraper, however the building management has not responded thus far to requests for potential construction.

== Fictional portrayals ==
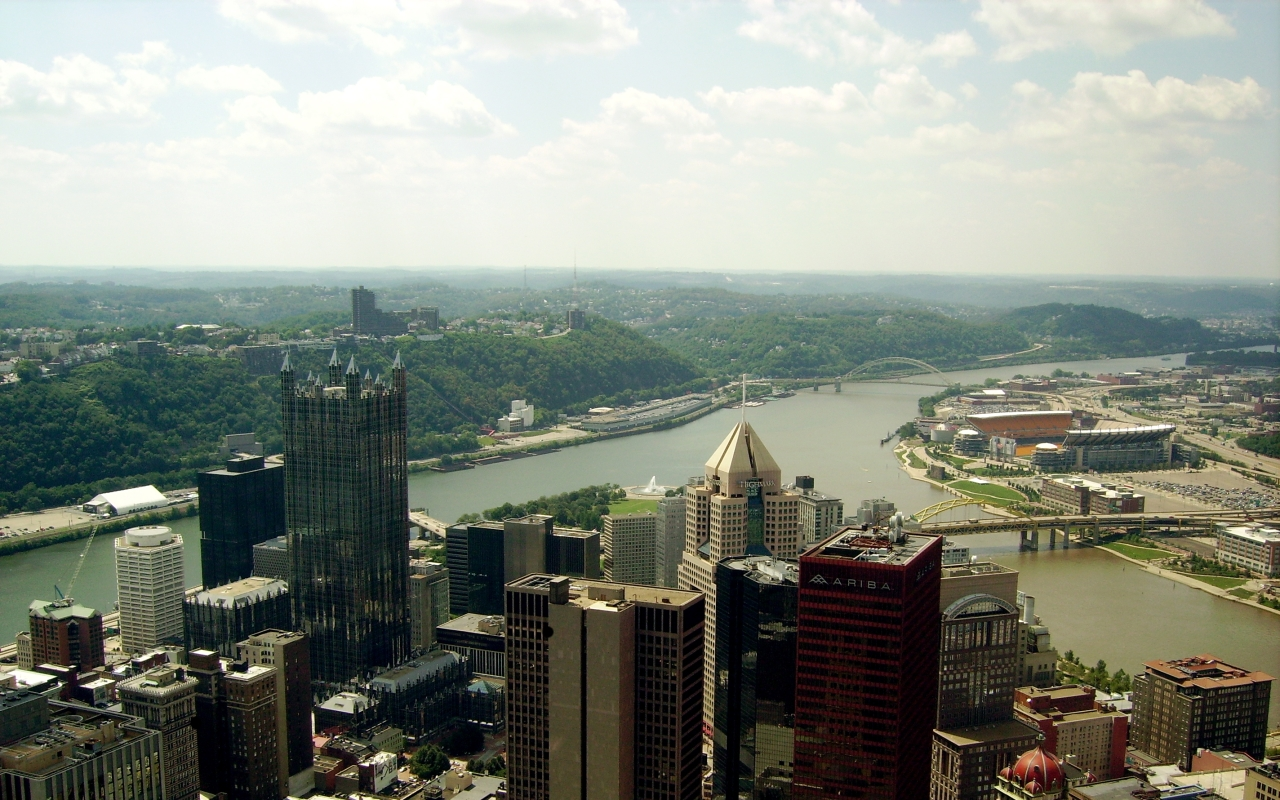
The view from the 62nd floor of the U.S. Steel Tower

The U.S. Steel Tower makes an appearance in the movie Dogma and figures prominently in Sudden Death, Boys on the Side, Striking Distance, Jack Reacher and the video for the 2010 rap song "Black and Yellow". It can also be seen in the movie The Dark Knight Rises, and in the video for the 1986 song "America" by the KBC Band. It is the setting for the Syfy network's series of web shorts, The Mercury Men. It can also be seen in George A. Romero's 1978 horror film, Dawn of the Dead.

The Tower has also been portrayed in multiple video games set in and around Pittsburgh. It can be seen in the Fallout 3 downloadable mission pack The Pitt. It is also viewable in The Last of Us sporting the letters "NA" at the top instead of the usual "UPMC". Most recently used on daytime soap opera The Young and the Restless.

== Gallery ==
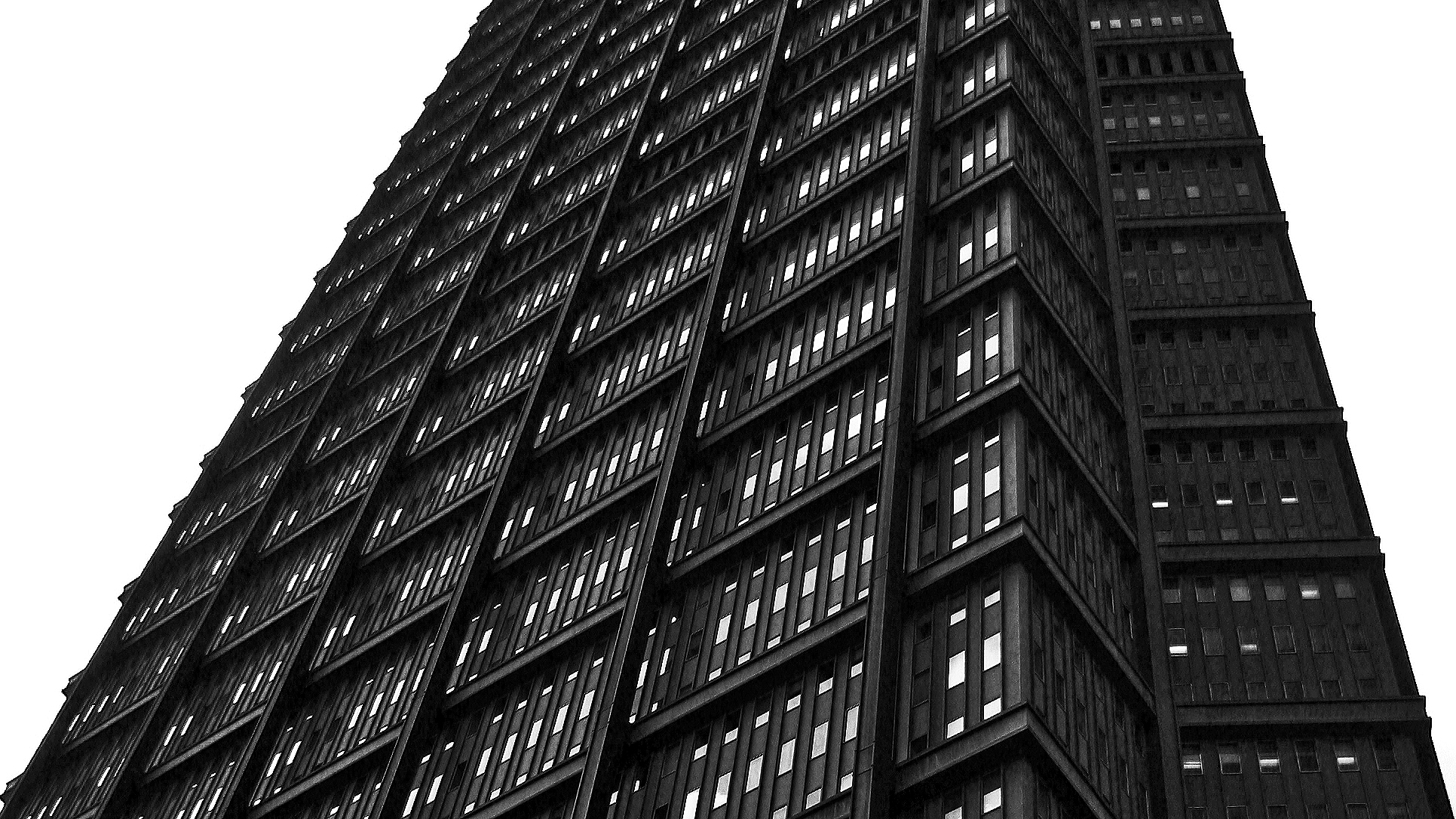
A view showing the corner angles, window layout, and exterior support columns

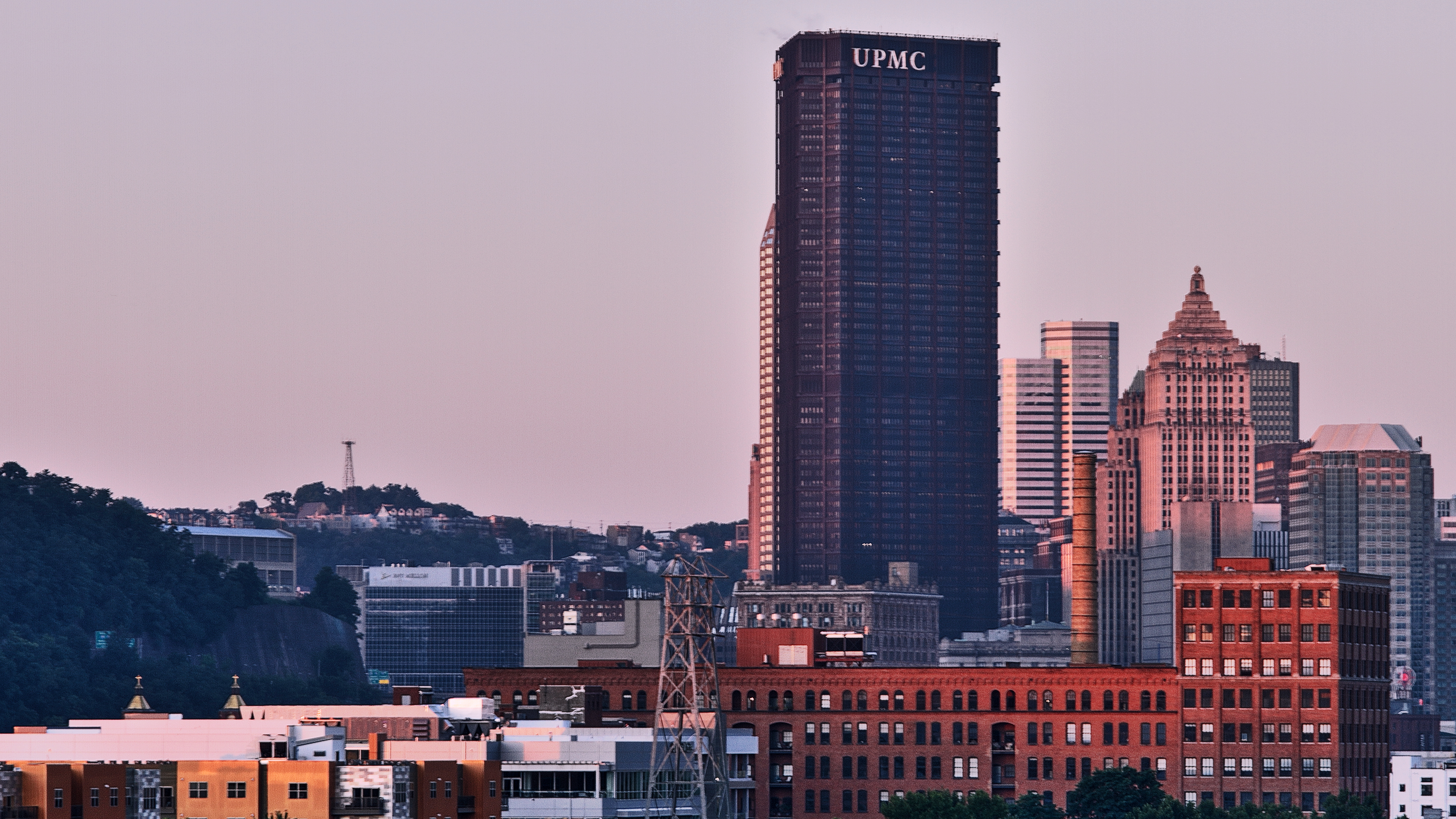
Viewed from the 31st Street Bridge in the morning light

== See also ==
- List of tallest buildings in Pittsburgh
- List of tallest buildings in the United States
- List of skyscrapers

Records
Preceded by Gulf Tower	Tallest building in Pennsylvania; 256 metres (840 ft); 1970–1987	Succeeded by One Liberty Place
Preceded by Gulf Tower	Tallest building in Pittsburgh; 256 metres (840 ft); 1970–present	Succeeded by Record holder

Preceded by BNY Mellon Center	Pittsburgh Skyscrapers by Height; 256 m (840 ft); 64 floors	Succeeded by Record holder
Preceded by Westinghouse Tower	Pittsburgh Skyscrapers by Year of Completion; 1971	Succeeded by Centre City Tower
