= First Avenue station (Pittsburgh) =

Light rail station in Pittsburgh, Pennsylvania

First Avenue
- First Avenue station in 2023

General information
- Location: First Avenue and Ross Street; Pittsburgh, Pennsylvania
- Coordinates: 40.4375°N 79.9966°W
- Owner: Pittsburgh Regional Transit
- Platforms: 2 side platforms
- Tracks: 2
- Connections: Pittsburgh Regional Transit: 52L, 53L, 56, 57, 58

Construction
- Structure type: Elevated
- Parking: 1,243 spaces
- Cycle facilities: Great Allegheny Passage trail access, bike shop
- Accessible: Yes

History
- Opened: November 16, 2001

Passengers
- 2020: 1,605 (weekday boardings)

Services
Preceding station	Pittsburgh Regional Transit	Following station
Steel Plaza toward Allegheny	Blue Line	Station Square toward South Hills Village
Steel Plaza toward Allegheny	Red Line	Station Square toward South Hills Village
Steel Plaza toward Allegheny	Silver Line	Station Square toward Library
Former services
Preceding station	Port Authority of Allegheny County	Following station
Steel Plaza toward Gateway	Brown Line	William toward South Hills Junction
Preceding station	Pittsburgh Regional Transit	Following station
Steel Plaza toward Allegheny	Subway Local	Station Square Terminus
Location

First Avenue station is a station on the Pittsburgh Light Rail system in Downtown Pittsburgh, operated by Pittsburgh Regional Transit. The station is located within the system's free fare zone, which also includes Steel Plaza, Wood Street, Gateway, North Side, and Allegheny.

Opened on November 16, 2001, the station was constructed as an infill station on the elevated viaduct connecting the Panhandle Bridge over the Monongahela River and the Panhandle Tunnel beneath downtown. Its construction was part of a broader development that included the PNC Firstside Center, completed in September 2000, and the Pittsburgh Parking Authority's 1,243-space First Avenue Garage, which is connected to the station by a skywalk. The garage includes bicycle facilities and there is nearby access to the Great Allegheny Passage trail.

The station serves the Firstside area of downtown, which includes government offices, commercial buildings such as Oxford Centre and the Grant Building, and nearby educational institutions including Point Park University and Duquesne University. The project cost $6.7 million.

== See also ==
- Grant Street Station (former train station near site of First Avenue station)
