= Wood Street Galleries =

Coordinates: 40°26′32.4″N 79°59′58″W

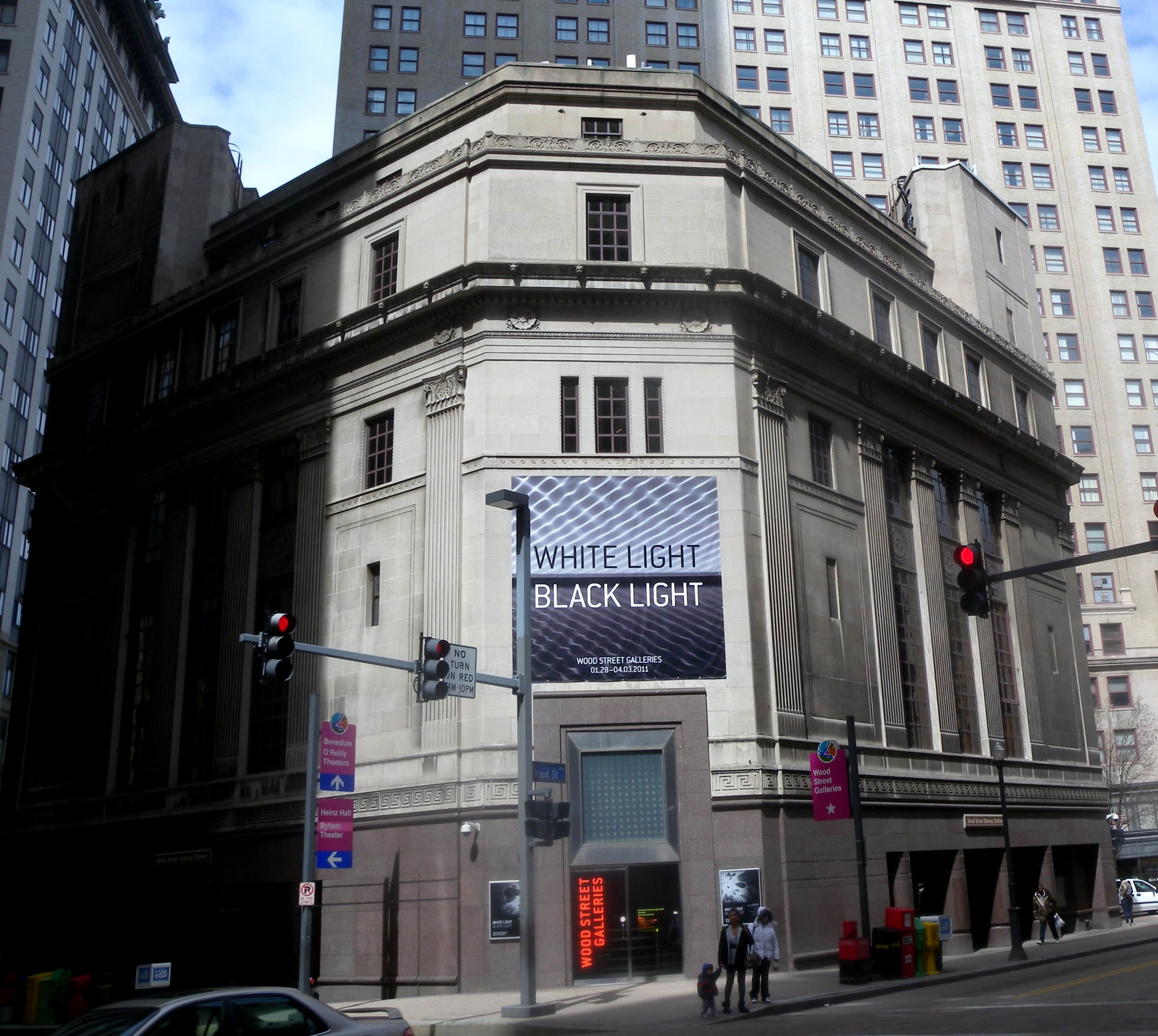
6th Avenue

Wood Street Galleries is an art gallery located in Downtown Pittsburgh, Pennsylvania, operated by the Pittsburgh Cultural Trust. The gallery has built a reputation for exhibiting international new media artists due to the yearslong curation of former director and curator, Murray Horne. The gallery occupies the upper floors of the Wood Street 'T Station' building.

== History ==
The trapezoidal building that houses the gallery has been rented to the Pittsburgh Cultural Trust since 1990 by the Pittsburgh Port Authority for $1 per year. Wood Street Galleries was established two years later in 1992, with former director and curator Murray Horne joining the gallery later in the 1990s.
