= BNY Mellon Center (Pittsburgh) =

55-story skyscraper located at 500 Grant Street in downtown Pittsburgh, Pennsylvania

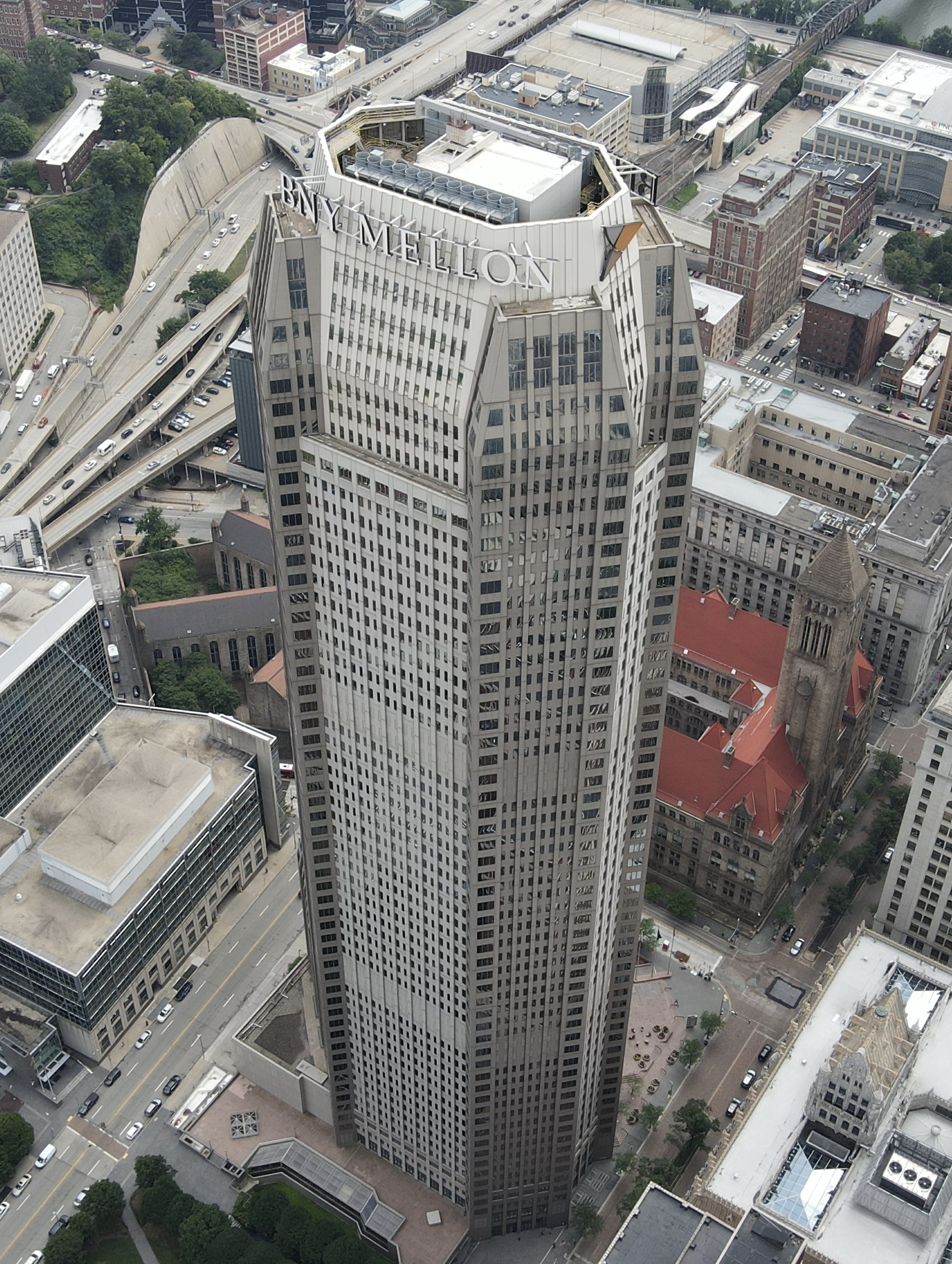
- Aerial view of BNY Mellon Center
- Interactive map of the BNY Mellon Center area
- Former names: Dravo Tower; 1 Mellon Bank Center

General information
- Type: Commercial offices (Authorized commercial offices)
- Architectural style: Modernist
- Location: 500 Grant St; Pittsburgh, Pennsylvania
- Coordinates: 40.4397°N 79.9961°W
- Construction started: October 1980
- Completed: June 1984
- Cost: $100 million+ ($443.6 million+ today)
- Owner: The Bank of New York Mellon
- Operator: CBRE

Height
- Roof: 725 ft (221 m)

Technical details
- Floor count: 55
- Floor area: 1,699,987 sq ft (157,934.0 m^{2})

Design and construction
- Architect: Welton Becket and Associates
- Developer: U.S. Steel
- Main contractor: Turner Construction

Other information
- Public transit: Steel Plaza

BNY Mellon Center is a 55-story skyscraper located at 500 Grant Street in downtown Pittsburgh, Pennsylvania. Standing 725 ft (221 m) tall, it is the second-tallest building in the city. Announced on March 27, 1980, the tower was completed in June 1984. It was initially planned to be the world headquarters of the Dravo Corporation (now Carmeuse Corporation) by its majority owner at the time and current neighbor U.S. Steel until Dravo was purchased in 1983. Upon opening, the building was named One Mellon Center after Mellon Financial Corporation, which used the tower as the company's global headquarters. In 2007, the company merged with Bank of New York to form The Bank of New York Mellon; the resulting corporation continues to use the building as one of its major offices. In 2008, the building was renamed to its current moniker as part of a branding initiative by The Bank of New York Mellon.

Prominent features of the building include its eight-sided design and mansard roof. The tower is connected to the U.S. Steel Tower through a tunnel which passes through Steel Plaza subway station. BNY Mellon Center is the ninth-tallest building in Pennsylvania (as well as the second-tallest within the state outside of Philadelphia) and 195th-tallest skyscraper in the world, and also the building with the highest taxable property value in Allegheny County, surpassing even the U.S. Steel Tower. On clear days, it is possible to spot the building from as far as 50 miles away, usually from the top of Chestnut Ridge.

== History ==
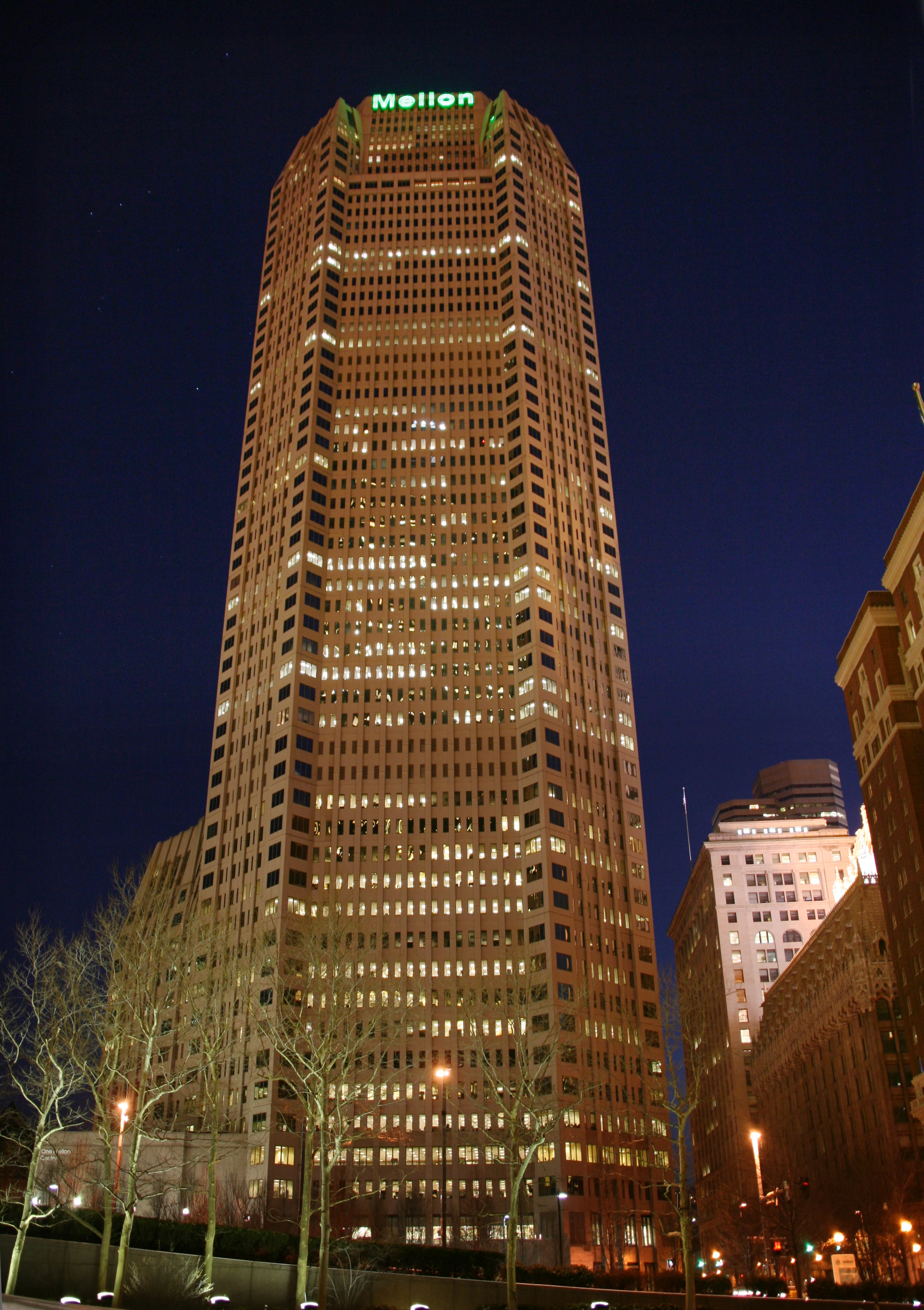
The tower in 2007.

The 500 block of Grant Street was for decades the site of the Carlton Hotel, Plaza Building and the "Interlude Lounge" across the street from the Allegheny County Courthouse on the current complex's southern extreme. In the early 1980s, U.S. Steel, which has its global headquarters one block north at the U.S. Steel Tower bought the land Mellon Center was to be built on and planned a 54-floor skyscraper replacing the Carlton Hotel and Plaza Buildings. The naming rights originally went to the Pittsburgh manufacturing firm Dravo Corporation and was to serve as their leased headquarters space (while still owned by U.S. Steel). After the recession of the late 1970s and early 1980s combined with the rapid deindustrialization of the 1980s, Dravo was bought out by a foreign conglomerate and its regional facilities were shuttered. U.S. Steel, having diversified into oil and other industries, sold the almost completed skyscraper on February 16, 1983, to a Connecticut Limited Partnership, the 500 Grant Street Partners, for what was then the second-largest real estate purchase in Western Pennsylvania history.

In March 2010, installation began on a new rooftop sign that would replace the old Mellon signage with the company's new triangular logo and the new brand name "BNY Mellon". The effort lasted until the end of 2010.

On Monday, March 29, 2010, at approximately 4:30 p.m., a maintenance worker committed suicide by intentionally falling from the roof. The worker who died, from the North Side region of the city, was a 10-year employee of the building's maintenance contractor.

The BNY Mellon lease ends in 2028 and the building's future after that is uncertain.

== Popular culture ==
The skyscraper features prominently in the 1983 film Flashdance (while still under construction) and the 1998 Michael Keaton film Desperate Measures (serving as part of the "hospital"). It also makes cameos in Sudden Death, Striking Distance and the 2010 rap video "Black and Yellow".

== See also ==
- List of tallest buildings in Pittsburgh
- List of tallest buildings in Pennsylvania
- List of tallest buildings in the United States

Preceded by One PPG Place	Pittsburgh Skyscrapers by Height; 725 feet (221 m); 54 floors	Succeeded by U.S. Steel Tower
Preceded by Federated Tower	Pittsburgh Skyscrapers by Year of Completion; 1984	Succeeded by Oxford Centre
