= Station Square station =

Transit station in Pittsburgh, Pennsylvania

Station Square
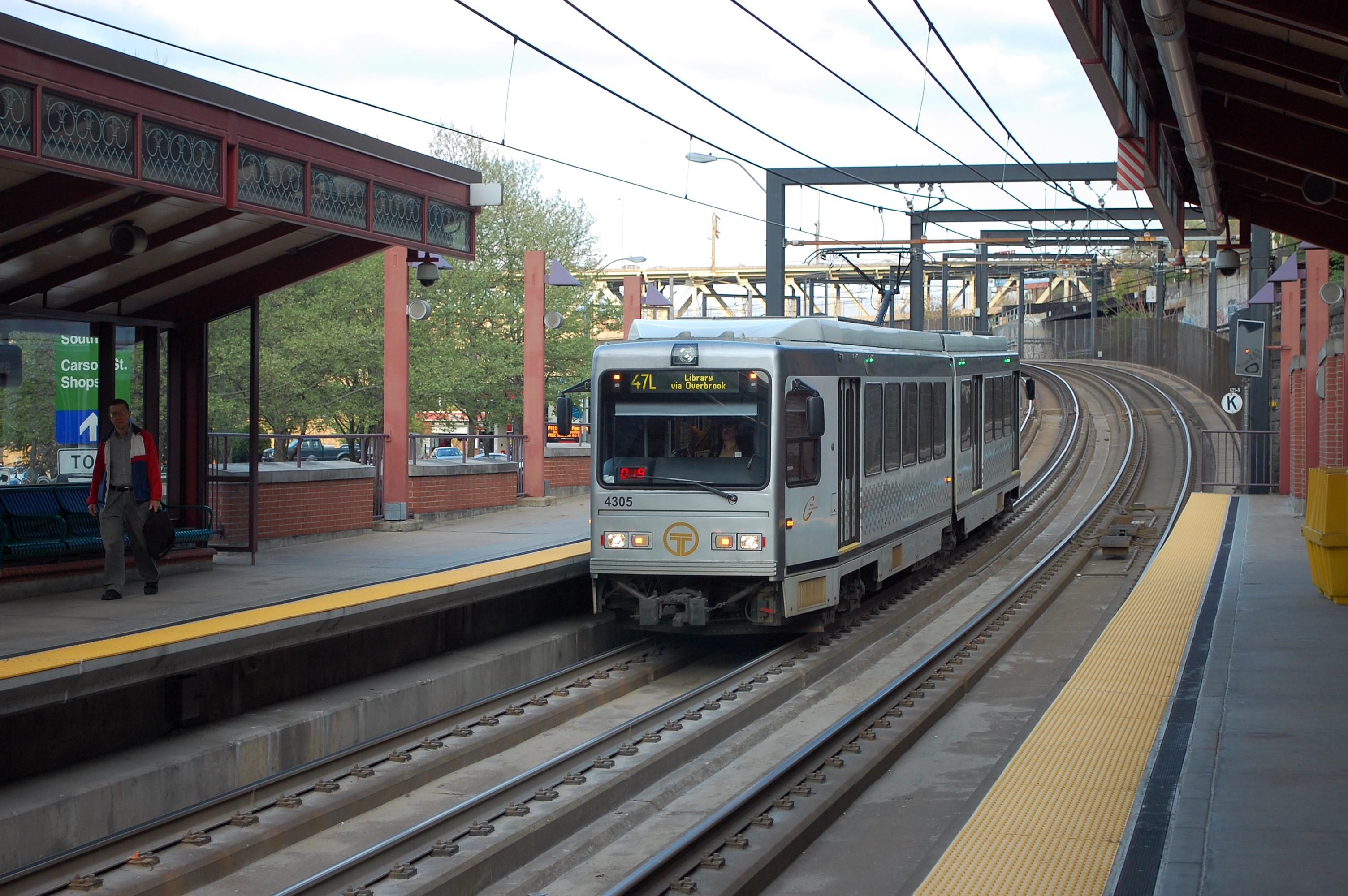
- Southbound train approaching Station Square from the Panhandle Bridge

General information
- Location: Carson Street at Smithfield Street Bridge; Pittsburgh, Pennsylvania
- Coordinates: 40.4317°N 80.0033°W
- Owner: Pittsburgh Regional Transit
- Platforms: 2 side platforms
- Tracks: 2
- Connections: Monongahela Incline; PRT: 39, 41, 44, 48, 51, 51L, Y1 , Y45 , Y46 , Y47 , Y49; MMVTA: A; FACT: Commuter

Construction
- Structure type: At-grade
- Parking: 160 spaces
- Accessible: Yes

History
- Opened: July 3, 1985

Passengers
- 2018: 1,304 (weekday boardings)

Services
Preceding station	Pittsburgh Regional Transit	Following station
First Avenue toward Allegheny	Blue Line	South Hills Junction toward South Hills Village
First Avenue toward Allegheny	Red Line	South Hills Junction toward South Hills Village
First Avenue toward Allegheny	Silver Line	South Hills Junction toward Library
Terminus	South Busway	South Hills Junction toward Glenbury or Dawn
Former services
Preceding station	Port Authority of Allegheny County	Following station
Steel Plaza toward Gateway	47D Drake 1984–1993	South Hills Junction toward Drake
Location

Station Square station is an intermodal transit station in the South Shore neighborhood of Pittsburgh, Pennsylvania, located at the Station Square shopping and entertainment complex. It is served by the Red Line, Blue Line, and Silver Line of the Pittsburgh Light Rail network, and is the northern terminus of the South Busway. The station is near the Monongahela Incline.

== History ==
This station is named after the nearby Station Square shopping and entertainment complex. The station was not originally planned to be built; instead, the light rail system was to bypass the newly created development because officials felt that there would not be enough ridership demand to justify the station. Active lobbying by Arthur P. Ziegler, Jr., President of Pittsburgh History and Landmarks Foundation, and developer of Station Square ensured that the station was constructed. Over three million tourists visit Station Square each year.

Originally designed and built by Daniel Sifer, the station encompasses railings rescued by Pittsburgh History and Landmarks Foundation from the Brady Street Bridge, which was demolished in 1978. In the late 1990s, DRS Architects renovated the station and provided architectural details in glass that reflected the design in the Brady Street Bridge railings.

On August 5, 2018, a Norfolk Southern freight train running on the Mon Line derailed east of Station Square station and blocked the freight tracks, forcing service to be suspended. The derailed cars fell down the hillside and onto the light rail tracks and damaged 1,600 feet (490 m) of light rail tracks; 4,000 feet (1,200 m) of overhead electrical wires; and some concrete on the Panhandle Bridge. The derailment caused no injuries, as it occurred 2 minutes after a T light rail train departed the station. During cleanup and inspections of the area, the Mount Washington Transit Tunnel was closed and trains were rerouted via the former Brown Line through Allentown. The outbound tracks were opened on August 23, while inbound service resumed on August 25 after repairs were completed. A preliminary report by the Federal Railroad Administration's investigation team found that a fractured track caused the derailment. Norfolk Southern filed a lawsuit in December 2018 seeking $1.1 million in reimbursements from the city for the incident, claiming that they had neglected to maintain the hillside.
