= Brown Line (Pittsburgh) =

Former light rail line in Pittsburgh, Pennsylvania

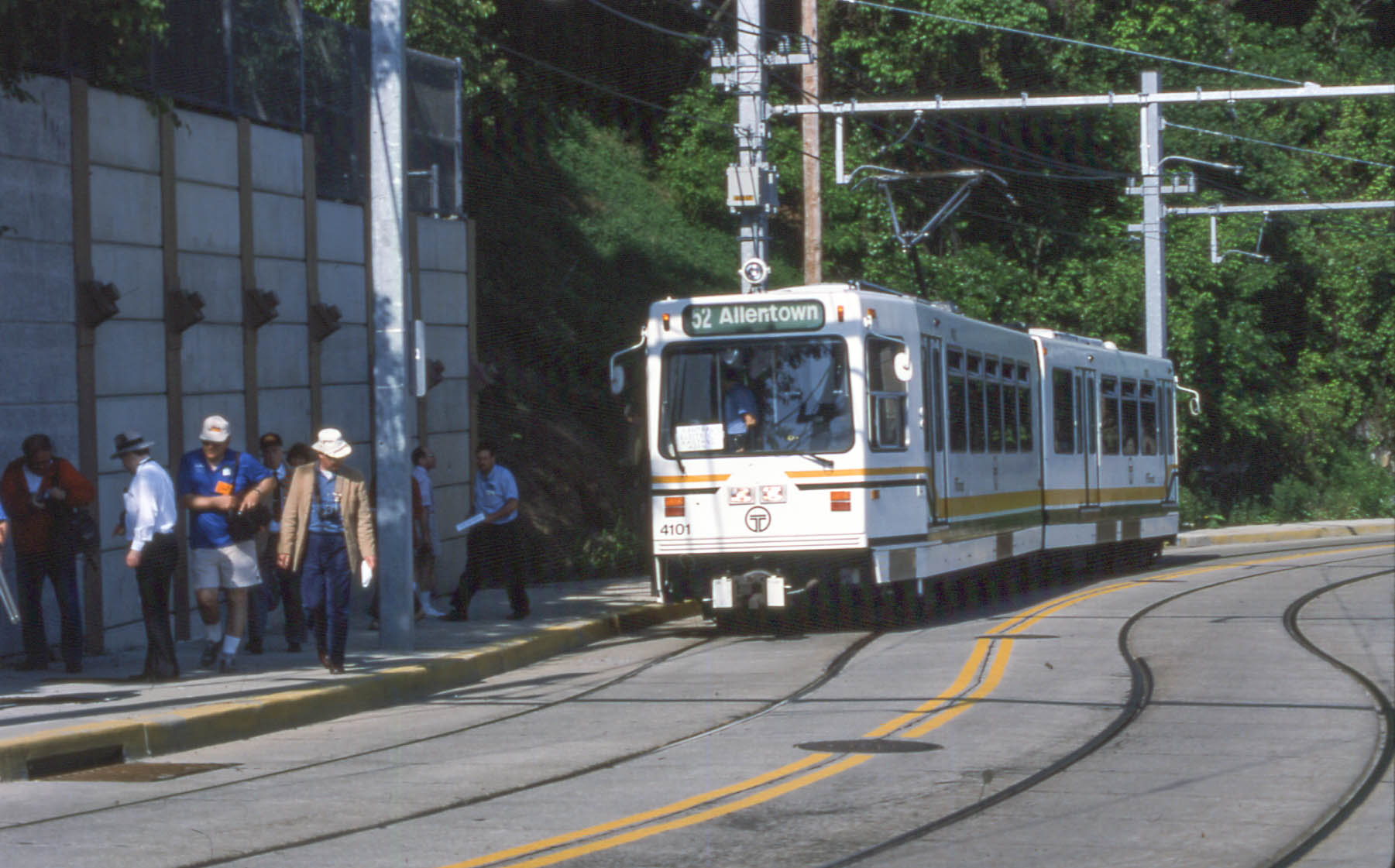
- Arlington Avenue.

Overview
- Other name: 52 Allentown
- Status: Discontinued, sometimes used as a detour route; reopening proposed
- Owner: Pittsburgh Regional Transit
- Locale: Pittsburgh, Pennsylvania, U.S.

Service
- Type: Light rail
- Operator: Pittsburgh Regional Transit (formerly Port Authority of Allegheny County)

History
- Closed: March 27, 2011 (regular service)

Technical
- Track gauge: 5 ft 2 1/2 in (1,588 mm)
- Electrification: Overhead line, 650 V DC
- Maximum incline: 10%
Route map
Brown Line highlighted in brown
Key

The Brown Line is an out-of-service branch of the Pittsburgh Light Rail system that ran from South Hills Junction over Mount Washington and across the Monongahela River to downtown Pittsburgh, terminating at Wood Street. It includes the steepest grade of any section of the Pittsburgh light rail system, of approximately 10 percent.

== History ==
The 52 Allentown route was created in 1984 by renaming what was then the 49 Arlington–Warrington, itself created in 1971 by combining portions of the 48 Arlington and 49 Beltzhoover lines. In April 2010 the 52 Allentown was rebranded the "Brown Line" by the Port Authority.

Prior to being discontinued, Brown Line service was severely reduced, operating only during Monday to Friday rush hours, with bus route 44 substitute providing service at other times. The Port Authority considered ending all Brown Line service, but this would have provided only limited savings unless the tracks and overhead wires were also decommissioned. More importantly, however, the Brown Line's tracks provide an alternate route when the Mt. Washington Transit Tunnel is closed (either due to planned maintenance or a stalled vehicle), allowing Red Line or Blue Line services to continue operating, albeit behind schedule since the Allentown routing takes five to eight minutes longer than via the tunnel, and at reduced frequency due to a short single-track section.

On March 27, 2011, the Brown Line service was withdrawn due to a system-wide 15% service cut.

The line is still used occasionally by Blue, Red, and Silver trains when the Mt. Washington Transit Tunnel is closed.

As of February 2021, The Port Authority's newly released 25-year plan includes the possibility of reviving service on the Allentown line due to continuing growth of the neighborhood.

In February 2025, the tracks temporarily reopened for Red and Blue line trains at all times and the Silver line on weekends due to the Mount Washington tunnel closure, with one temporary intermediate stop at Warrington and Allen.

== Route ==
The Brown Line was much shorter and ran less frequently than the Red and Blue Lines. It provided service to the Allentown neighborhood of Pittsburgh, Pennsylvania, where dense housing and the hilly terrain make automobile transportation difficult. The route began at South Hills Junction, climbing upwards to Haberman and East Warrington Avenue. It continued along Warrington in an easterly direction until turning left onto Arlington Avenue, where it followed the sharply curving street northwards, over the shoulder of Mount Washington. At the intersection of McArdle Roadway, it swung onto private right-of-way to reach the Panhandle Bridge (also used by the Red and Blue Lines) to cross the Monongahela River and gain entry to downtown, stopping at First Avenue, Steel Plaza, and Wood Street. The entire line operated within the city of Pittsburgh.
