= Transportation in Pittsburgh =

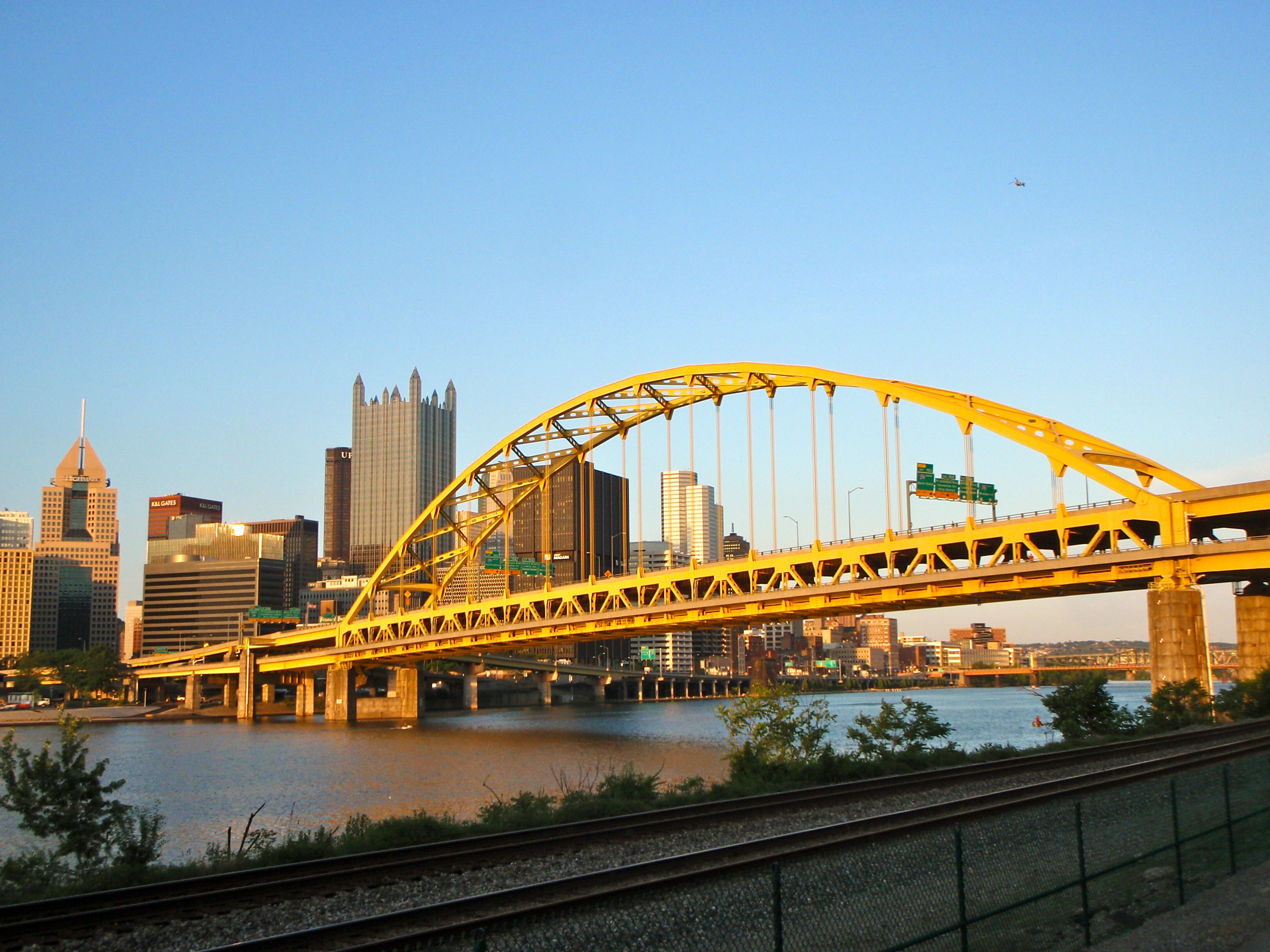
Fort Pitt Bridge with Downtown Pittsburgh in the background

A large metropolitan area that is surrounded by rivers and hills, Pittsburgh has an infrastructure system that has been built out over the years to include roads, tunnels, bridges, railroads, inclines, bike paths, and stairways; however, the hills and rivers still form many barriers to transportation within the city.

== Roads and infrastructure ==
The high number of freeze/thaw cycles during the winter is sometimes blamed for the difficulty of maintaining local roads.

=== Streets ===
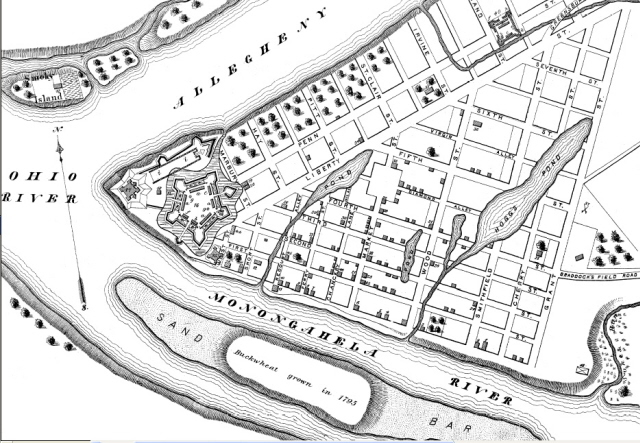
A 1795 map of Pittsburgh

Pittsburgh is home to several notable streets. Roslyn Place is a small wooden-paved cul-de-sac located in the Shadyside neighborhood of Pittsburgh, Pennsylvania. The street was built in 1914 in the Nicolson Pavement style and is home to the historic Roslyn Place district.

Canton Avenue is the steepest officially recorded public street in the United States.

East Carson Street has one of the largest concentrations of 19th-century homes, which has prompted outsiders to call the neighborhood the city's Georgetown. It includes many bars and restaurants as well as residences.

Grant Street is the main government and business corridor in Pittsburgh, Pennsylvania. It is home to the global headquarters of U.S. Steel, Koppers Chemicals, Federated Investors, and Oxford Development. It is also home to the seat of Allegheny County, the City of Pittsburgh, and the regional Federal Government offices. It is part of the Pittsburgh Central Downtown Historic District.

The list of notable streets in Pittsburgh are as follows.

Street	Route	Communities	Landmarks	Notes
Boulevard of the Allies	Commonwealth Place to Panther Hollow Road	Pittsburgh	Phipps Conservatory and Botanical Gardens	
Brownsville Road	PA 88 in South Park Township to Arlington Avenue in Pittsburgh	Pittsburgh		
Butler Street	Penn Avenue to Highland Park Bridge	Pittsburgh	Doughboy	
Canton Avenue	Coast Avenue to Hampshire Avenue	Pittsburgh		steepest officially recorded public street in the United States
Centre Avenue	Sixth Avenue to East Liberty Blvd	Pittsburgh	Allegheny County Courthouse	
Ellsworth Avenue	Neville Street to Shady Avenue	Pittsburgh	Church of the Ascension	
Fifth Avenue	Oliver Avenue to Forbes Avenue	Pittsburgh	University of Pittsburgh (William Pitt Union), Howe-Childs Gate House, Negley–Gwinner–Harter House, Allegheny County Courthouse, Fifth Avenue High School	
Forbes Avenue	Fifth Avenue to Fourth Avenue	Pittsburgh	University of Pittsburgh (Cathedral of Learning), Carnegie Mellon University, Carnegie Museums of Pittsburgh, Carnegie Museum of Natural History, Carnegie Museum of Art, Carnegie Library of Pittsburgh	
Fort Pitt Boulevard	Commonwealth Place to Boulevard of the Allies	Pittsburgh		
Grant Street	I-376 / US 22 / US 30 to Liberty Avenue	Pittsburgh	William S. Moorhead Federal Building, Federal Reserve Bank of Cleveland Pittsburgh Branch, Gulf Tower, Joseph F. Weis, Jr. U.S. Courthouse, U.S. Steel Tower, Koppers Tower, BNY Mellon Center, Omni William Penn Hotel, Union Trust Building, Frick Building, Allegheny County Courthouse, Grant Building, One Oxford Centre, Pittsburgh City-County Building	
Liberty Avenue	I-376 / US 22 / US 30 to Aiken Avenue	Pittsburgh	Strip District, Benedum Center, Harris Theater	
Roslyn Place		Pittsburgh	Roslyn Place district	
Stanwix Street	Boulevard of the Allies to Fort Duquesne Boulevard	Pittsburgh	PPG Place, Fifth Avenue Place	
Walnut Street	Aiken Street to Denniston Street	Pittsburgh	Pamela's Diner, Henne Jewelers	

=== Expressways ===
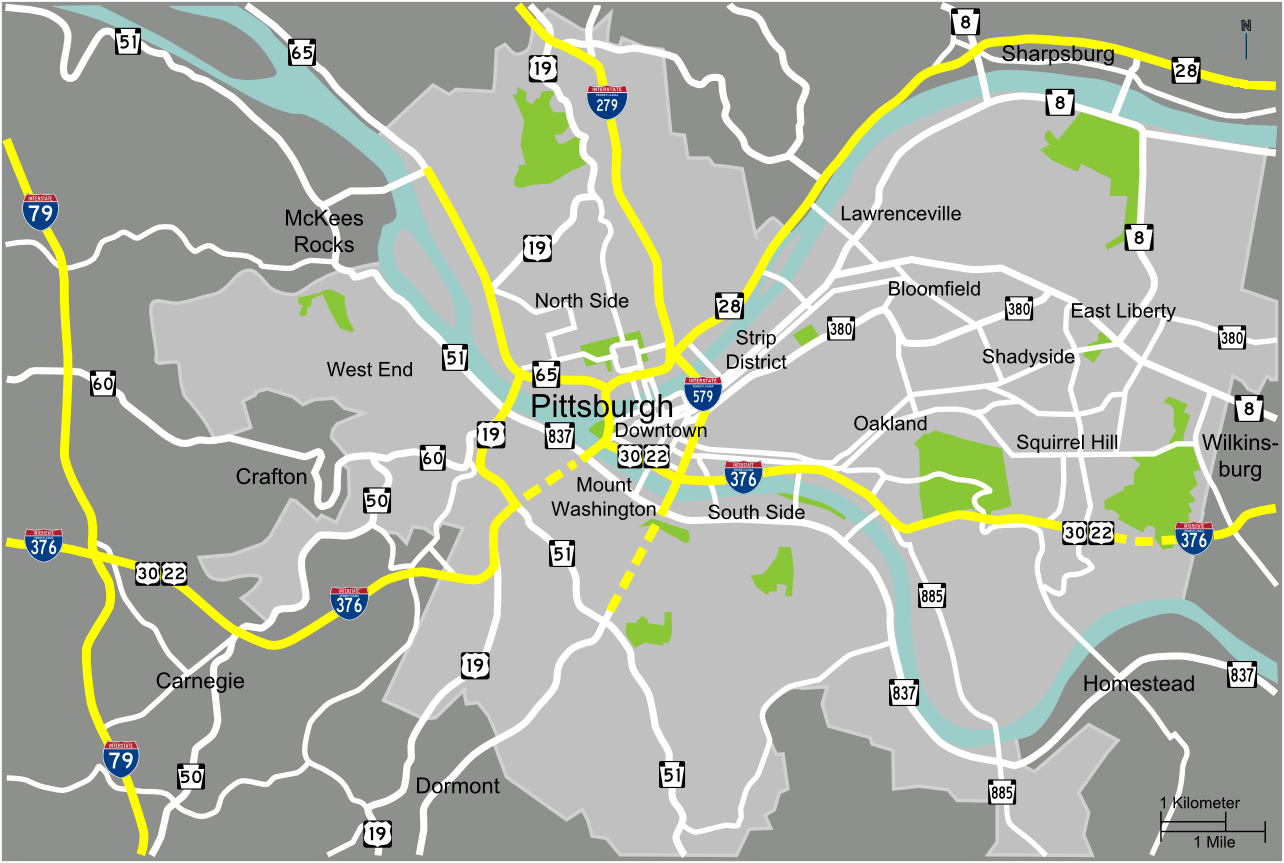
Map showing major highways in Pittsburgh and its surrounding region

Pittsburgh's major highways are the "Parkways," and each one connects the city to a different direction. The Parkway East links Pittsburgh to the Pennsylvania Turnpike (I-76). It's known for congestion at the Squirrel Hill interchange and tunnel, where tall trucks have repeatedly gotten stuck against the tunnel roof. The Parkway West runs from downtown to the Pittsburgh International Airport terminal and continues into the Airport Parkway and Southern Expressway. Parkway North heads north to merge with I-79, serving the North Hills and Cranberry area. Crosstown Boulevard, a spur off Parkway North that eases downtown and North Shore traffic, including trips to the convention center and PPG Paints Arena. The HOV lanes on the Parkway North and a short stretch of I-579 over the Veterans Bridge have reversible HOV lanes for rush hour, requiring at least two occupants. There is no "HOV OK" exemption for electric or hybrid vehicles.

The list of expressways serving Pittsburgh is as follows:

Route	Expressway	Notes	Images
I-376	Parkway East	The main highway connecting Pittsburgh to the Pennsylvania Turnpike (I-76) on the east is I-376, known to locals as the "Parkway East." It includes the locally notorious Squirrel Hill interchange, where unusual traffic patterns and the adjoining tunnel often cause traffic congestion. Several accidents have involved tall trucks getting stuck against the tunnel roof.	
I-376	Parkway West	Also part of I-376 is the "Parkway West," which leads from downtown Pittsburgh to the Pittsburgh International Airport's main terminal and leads into the contiguous Airport Parkway and Southern Expressway.	
I-279	Parkway North	I-279, known as the "Parkway North," runs north of the city to merge with I-79. It connects the city with the North Hills and the Cranberry area. North of the city, the Parkway North and a short section of Interstate 579 over the Veterans Bridge have reversible high occupancy vehicle HOV lanes for rush-hour commuting, which require a minimum of two occupants per vehicle for use; no electric/hybrid vehicle "HOV OK" program has yet been made available.	
I-579	Crosstown Boulevard	I-579, or the "Crosstown Boulevard," is a spur off of I-279 that alleviates downtown and North Shore traffic headed north or south and to events at either the convention center or the PPG Paints Arena. It links to I-279 via the Veterans Bridge.	
PA 28	Allegheny Valley Expressway	PA 28 begins adjacent to Downtown Pittsburgh at Anderson Street near the Interstate 279 (I-279)/I-579 interchange and travels north/northeast along the northern bank of the Allegheny River. Until recently the route was a surface street for the first two miles (3.2 km) until the 40th Street Bridge and then an expressway from 40th Street to Kittanning. Upgrades in 2013 made it a limited-access highway throughout its 44.5 miles (71.6 km) in the Pittsburgh metropolitan area from the route's start at I-279 to Rayburn Township, Armstrong County, with Governor Tom Corbett attending the completion ceremony on November 17, 2014.	
PA 65	Ohio River Boulevard	PA 65 begins in the Golden Triangle of Pittsburgh as a limited-access highway, following the bank of the Allegheny and Ohio rivers around the Manchester neighborhood, passing north of Acrisure Stadium and west of PNC Park. While limited-access, the road becomes Ohio River Boulevard, named for the river that PA 65 parallels for 25 miles (40 km) between the city of Pittsburgh and the borough of Rochester.	
PA 380	Bigelow Boulevard	PA 380 begins along the ramps of the Bigelow Boulevard and Interstate 579 interchange in Downtown Pittsburgh, north of the former Civic Arena complex. The route proceeds east traversing Ammon Playground park in the Hill District. PA 380 also parallels Norfolk Southern's Pittsburgh Line and the PRT's Martin Luther King Jr. East Busway on this section of the four-lane Bigelow Boulevard. In the neighborhood of Polish Hill, PA 380 intersects the Bloomfield Bridge via eastbound ramp and westbound at-grade intersection; the bridge connects to Liberty Avenue and the Bloomfield neighborhood.	
I-376 Toll	Beaver Valley Expressway	A 16-mile (26 km) stretch of the Beaver Valley Expressway, officially named the James E. Ross Highway, from exit 15 where I-376 ends its brief concurrency with U.S. Route 422 (US 422) to exit 31 where I-376 has its first interchange with Pennsylvania Route 51 (PA 51), is tolled and is maintained by the Pennsylvania Turnpike Commission (PTC), while the remainder of the highway is maintained by the Pennsylvania Department of Transportation (PennDOT). Near the airport, I-376 also has a business loop.	
PA Turnpike 576	Southern Beltway	PA Turnpike 579, also known as the Southern Beltway, is a controlled-access toll road in the southern and western suburbs of Pittsburgh, Pennsylvania, United States. It is envisioned to serve as a southern beltway around the Greater Pittsburgh area between Pittsburgh International Airport and the historic Steel Valley of the Monongahela River.	
PA Turnpike 43	Mon–Fayette Expressway	The Mon–Fayette Expressway, commonly referred to as "Toll 43", is a partially-completed controlled-access toll road that is planned to eventually link Interstate 68 near Morgantown, West Virginia, with Interstate 376 near Monroeville, Pennsylvania. The ultimate goal of the highway is to provide a high speed north–south connection between Morgantown and the eastern side of Pittsburgh while revitalizing economically distressed Monongahela River Valley towns in Fayette and Washington counties, serving as an alternative to Interstate 79 to the west, as well as relieving congestion on the PA 51 alignment from Pittsburgh to Uniontown.	
I-79	Pittsburgh–Erie Expressway	Interstate 79 mostly bypasses Pittsburgh to the west between the Pittsburgh International Airport and Downtown Pittsburgh. The freeway into Pittsburgh requires drivers to use I-376. In the Greater Pittsburgh area, the route serves the western suburbs between Washington and Cranberry Township where it meets the Pennsylvania Turnpike.	
I-76 Toll / Penna Turnpike	Pennsylvania Turnpike	Interstate 76 as the Pennsylvania Turnpike mostly bypasses Pittsburgh to the north and east. Several routes intersect the turnpike giving access to the suburbs of Cranberry Township at I-79, Hampton Township at PA 8 and Harmar Township at PA 28, and Monroeville at I-376.	
I-70	Express Highway	Interstate 70 mostly bypasses Pittsburgh to the south serving the area around Washington. It intersects with several roads that connect into Pittsburgh including Interstate 79, Pennsylvania Route 88, Pennsylvania Route 43, and Pennsylvania Route 51.	

==== Cancelled freeways ====
A freeway revolt occurred in Pittsburgh, where stub ramps near the Birmingham Bridge exist from the cancellation of the unbuilt Oakland Crosstown Freeway. Other canceled freeways include the South Hills Expressway, Pittsburgh–McKeesport Expressway, and the East Liberty Expressway.

The following is a list of cancelled freeways:

- Oakland Crosstown Freeway
- Pennsylvania Route 8 Expressway
- Tri-Boro Expressway
- Chartiers Valley Expressway
- East Liberty Expressway
- South Hills Expressway
- Saw Mill Run Expressway

=== Belt system ===
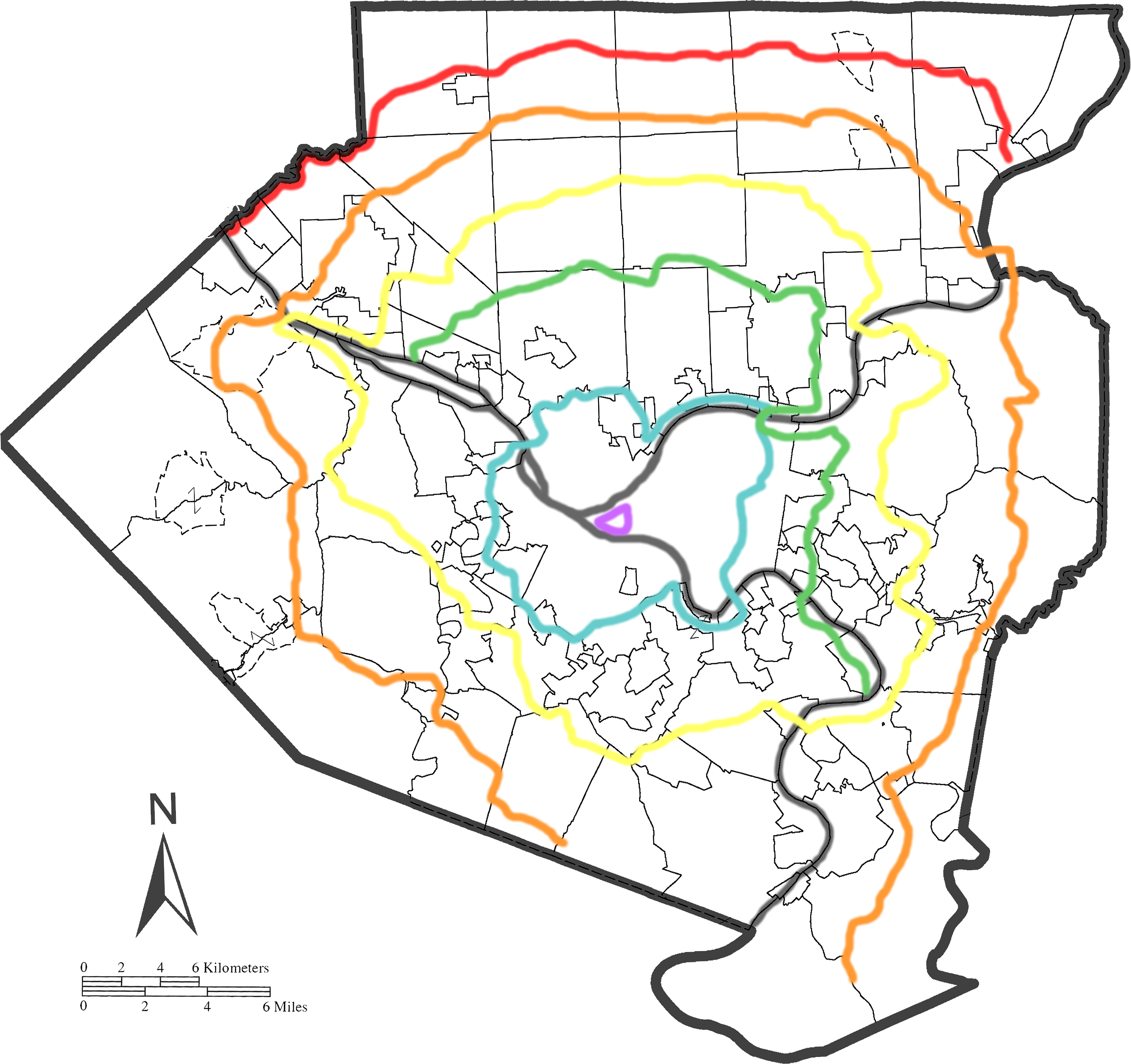
Allegheny County Belt System

Unlike many other major U.S. cities, Pittsburgh lacks a dedicated contiguous beltway surrounding the city. I-76 (Pennsylvania Turnpike), I-79, and I-70 form a roughly triangular-shaped "beltway," but the distance of these roads from the city center and the need to exit and enter each leg to continue circling the city render them impractical as a beltway; commuters are forced to use secondary roads to go from suburb to suburb. The Allegheny County Belt System is an attempt to address this without building additional infrastructure. The Pittsburgh Wayfinder System is a similar system that aims to guide travelers to popular destinations and services in the city proper.

Route	Length (mi)	Length (km)	From	To	Notes
Red Belt	33.5	53.91	PA 65 in Leetsdale	7th Avenue in Tarentum	
Orange Belt	91.7	147.58	PA 88 in Bethel Park	PA 51 in Forward Township	
Yellow Belt	77.6	124.89			Full circle
Green Belt	38.6	62.12	PA 65 in Emsworth	PA 148 in McKeesport	
Blue Belt	38.1	61.32			Full circle
Purple Belt	2.03	3.27			Full circle

=== Bridges and tunnels ===
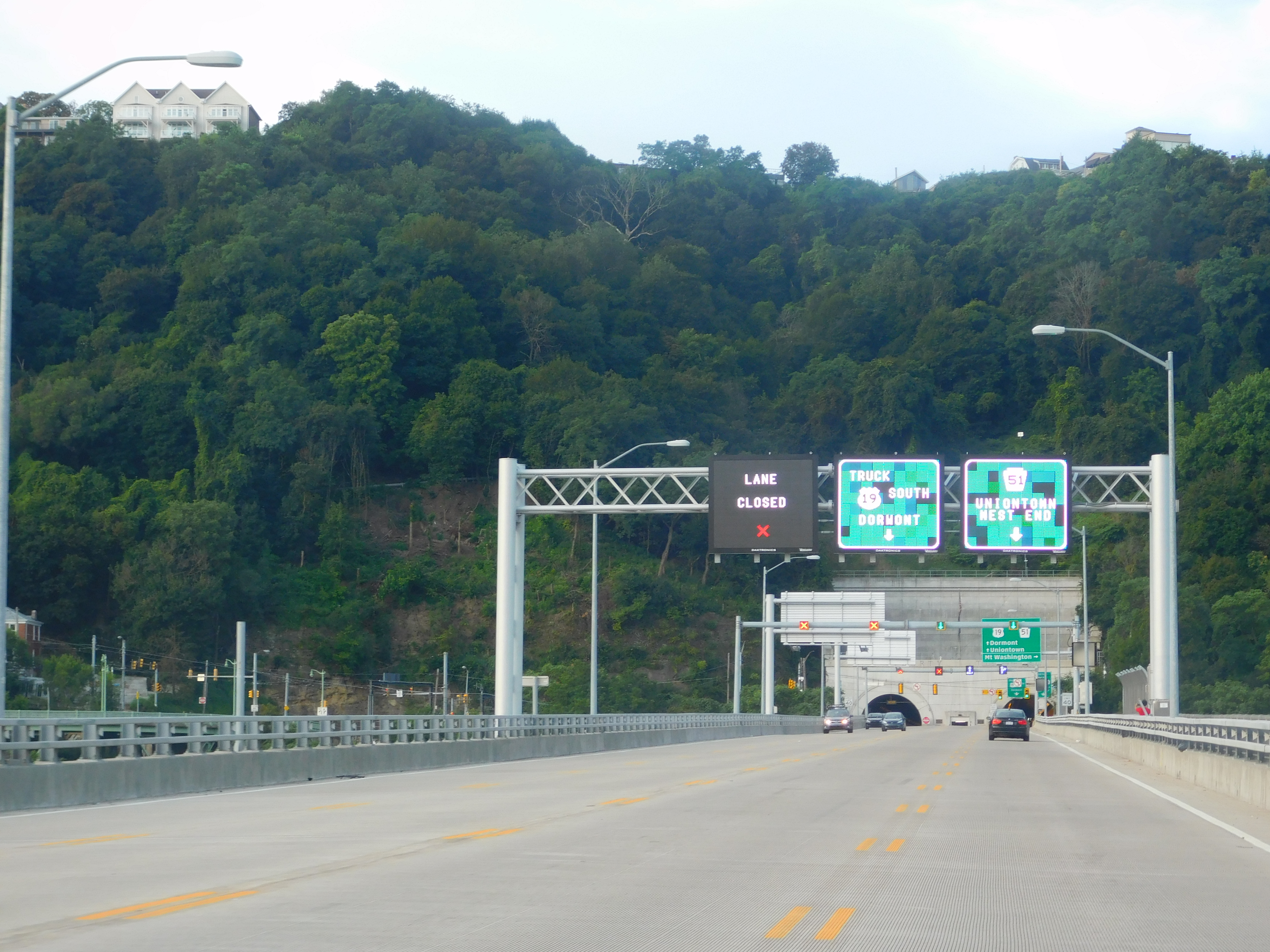
Liberty Bridge with the entrance to the Liberty Tunnels shown in the background.

Pittsburgh is a city of bridges: over 2,000 bridges dot the landscape of Allegheny County. The southern entrance to downtown is through the Fort Pitt Tunnel and then over the Fort Pitt Bridge.

The Panhandle Bridge, a former railroad bridge, carries Pittsburgh Regional Transit's Blue, Silver, and Red (formerly 42S/47L) light rail lines across the Monongahela River. Other notable bridges are Fort Duquesne Bridge, the Liberty Bridge, and The Three Sisters.

Notable tunnels include two interstate highway tunnels on I-376, Fort Pitt Tunnel and Squirrel Hill Tunnel; major traffic tunnels Armstrong Tunnel and Liberty Tunnels; the light rail tunnel, Mt. Washington Transit Tunnel, the Schenley Tunnel, the Wabash Tunnel and Corliss Tunnel.

== Local public transportation ==
Local public transportation is coordinated by Pittsburgh Regional Transit (PRT), the 14th-largest urban mass transit system in the United States. It services 730 square miles (1,900 km^{2}), including all of Allegheny County and portions of Armstrong, Beaver, Washington, and Westmoreland counties. PRT maintains a network of intracity bus routes, two inclines on Mt. Washington above Downtown (mostly a tourist attraction rather than a means of commuting), and a light rail/busway system. The transit agency discontinued its commuter rail system, the PATrain, in 1989. However, A New Line To Arnold Has Been Proposed Since 2009.

=== Subway and Light rail ===
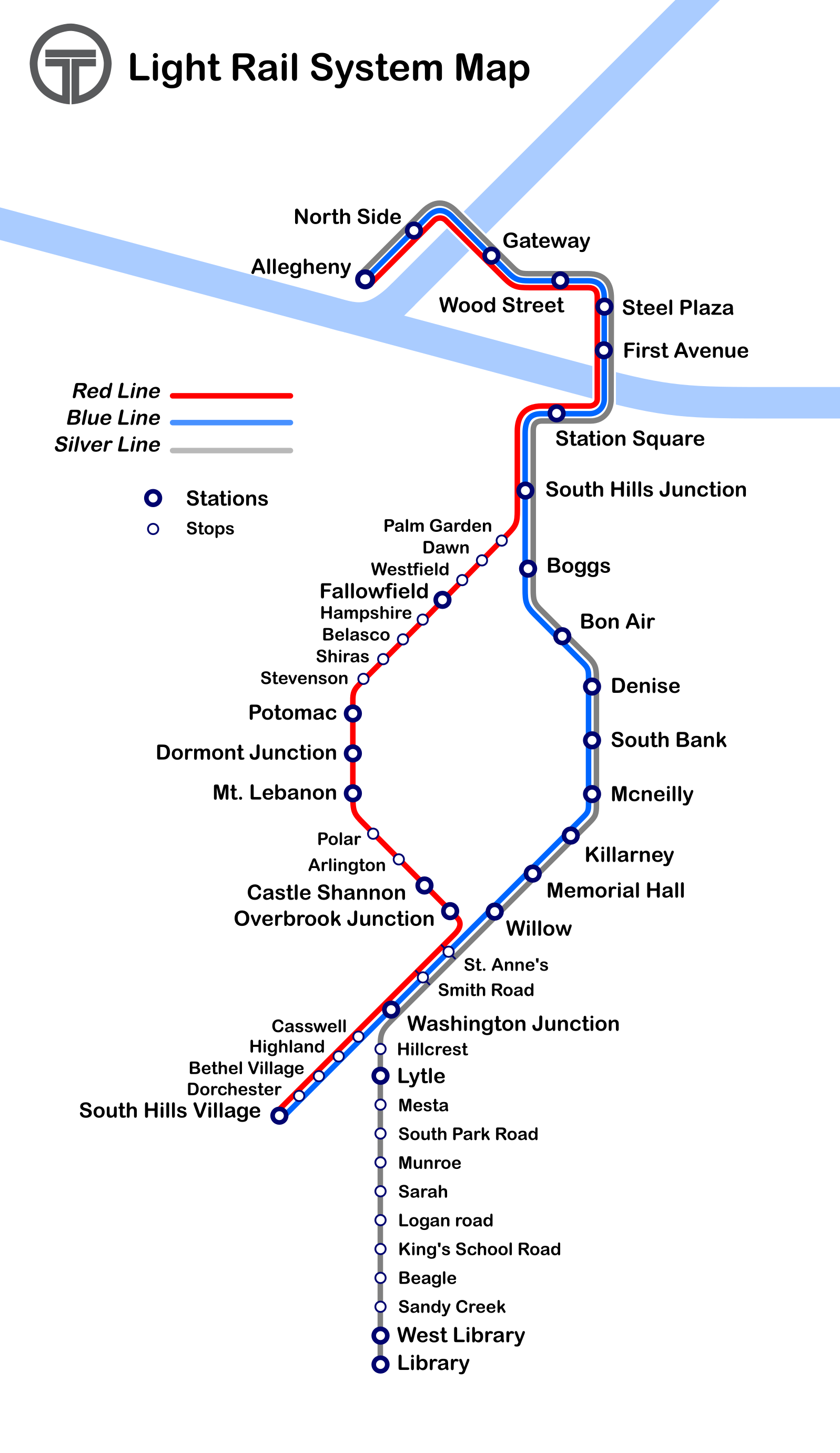
Route map of the three lines on the Pittsburgh light rail system

The Pittsburgh Light Rail operates as a deep-level subway in Downtown Pittsburgh, but runs mostly at-grade in suburban areas south of the city. It is largely linear in a north–south direction, with one terminus near the central business district and two termini in the South Hills. The system is owned and operated by Pittsburgh Regional Transit.

The light rail network is a direct descendant of the original streetcar system, which once numbered dozens of lines and included interurban routes to neighboring cities such as Washington and Charleroi. The current network comprises five routes on 25 miles (40 km) of track, operated by modern articulated light rail vehicles. However, most is on dedicated right-of-way, including the Mt. Washington Transit Tunnel, trains still street run in the Beechview neighborhood. Once across the Monongahela River, trains enter a subway to serve Downtown Pittsburgh. Since March 2012, the North Shore Connector has extended service across the Allegheny River, via tunnel, to such destinations as PNC Park, Heinz Field, and Rivers Casino.

The following colors designate light rail lines:

Route	Route Name	Destination	Service	Notes
	Red Line	Allegheny to South Hills Village	Daily	Uses Beechview light rail route
	Blue Line	Allegheny to South Hills Village	Daily	Uses Overbrook light rail route
	Silver Line	Allegheny to Library	Daily	Uses Overbrook light rail route

==== Downtown Pittsburgh Subway and Light rail stations ====
The following PRT stations exist in Downtown Pittsburgh. Travel within these stations are free of charge:

Steel Plaza subway station in downtown Pittsburgh

- Gateway station
- Wood Street station
- Steel Plaza station
- First Avenue station

=== Local bus service ===
Pittsburgh Regional Transit's bus system serves Allegheny County, with limited service extending into portions of Beaver, Butler, and Westmoreland counties. The system consists of 95 routes, 26 of which are bus rapid transit services (internally called "flyer" routes) that use dedicated busways.

Neighboring counties operate separate transit systems, some of which provide service to Downtown Pittsburgh with connections to Pittsburgh Regional Transit. In 2025, the system recorded 33,631,100 passenger trips.

PRT maintains a fleet of more than 700 buses powered by diesel, diesel-electric hybrid, and battery-electric propulsion.

==== Busways and Bus Rapid Transit (BRT) ====
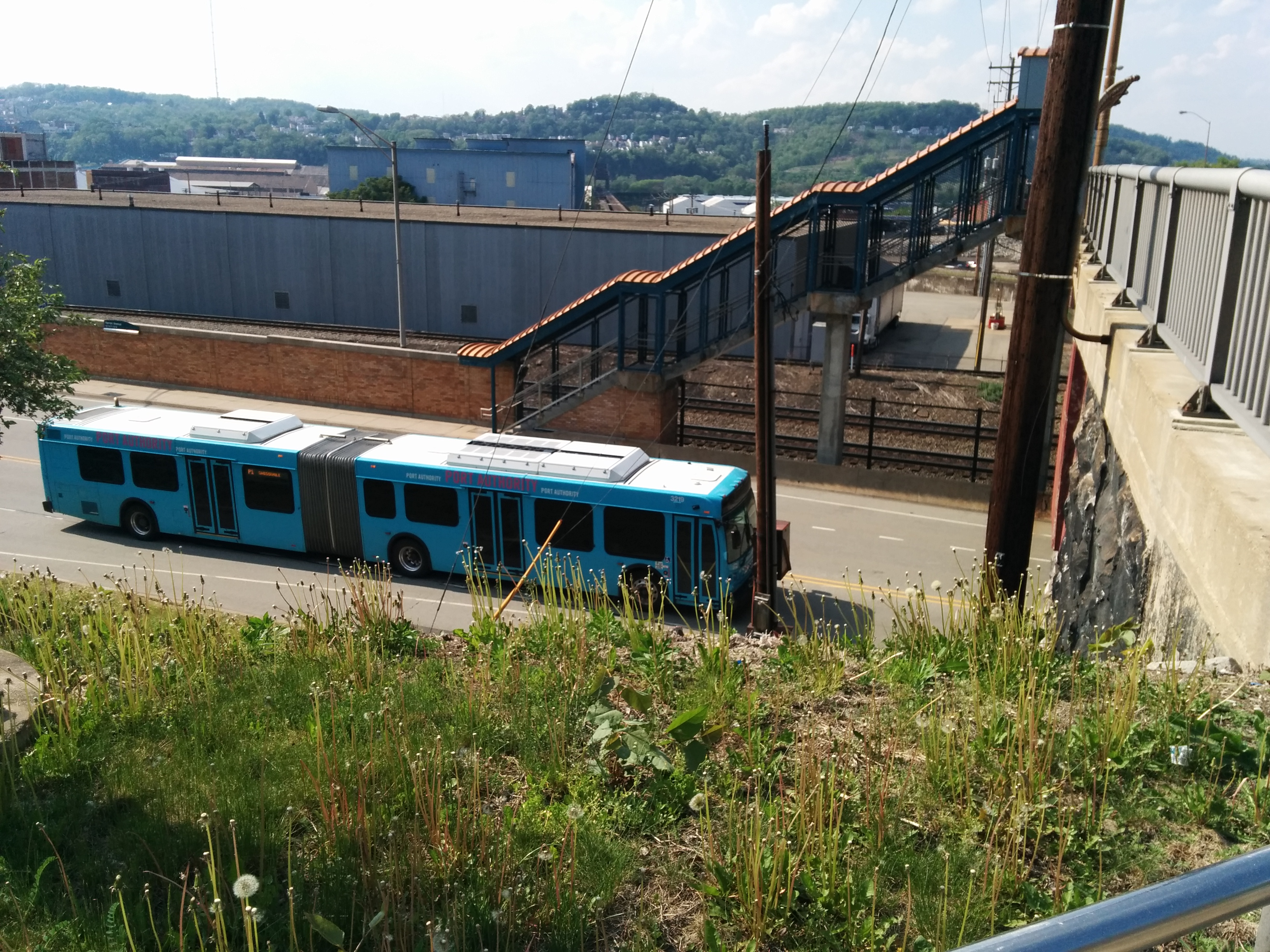
Herron station on the East Busway

PRT operates over 800 buses on both standard routes and bus rapid transit routes in Allegheny County. The latter use high-speed articulated buses that run at grade and above ground on their own right-of-way with platform stations, much like a rail system. In some instances, such as the Mount Washington tunnel, these buses travel along paved sections of the light rail line. There are currently three routes: the South Busway, from downtown to the southern part of Allegheny County, the Martin Luther King Jr. East Busway, from the Amtrak station to the eastern suburbs, and the West Busway, to the western suburbs.

All light rail/busway stations outside the downtown have PRT station shuttles that serve the surrounding neighborhoods, and sections of the metropolitan area not served by the light rail/busway system, including most of the northern suburbs, have regular PRT bus routes. The mass transit systems of Beaver, Fayette, Lawrence, Washington, and Westmoreland counties (including Mid Mon Valley Transit Authority) operate their own commuter shuttles to and from the city; the private company Myers Coach Line operates commuter service from Butler County. The mass transit system of Monongalia County, West Virginia also provides connections to Pittsburgh. In early 2005, the Southwestern Pennsylvania Commission proposed combining Pittsburgh Regional Transit, then known as Port Authority, with the nine surrounding metro counties' transit agencies.

The following colors designate busways:

- Green—bus routes using the West Busway, designated with a 'G'
- Purple—bus routes using the Martin Luther King Jr. East Busway, designated with a 'P'
- Orange—bus routes using the I-279 HOV lane, designated with an 'O'
- Yellow—bus routes using the South Busway, designated with a 'Y'

On July 22, 2011, the Port Authority approved spending at least $1 million, including $837,993 in federal funding and $209,498 in county money, to study developing a rapid bus line from downtown to the Oakland section. The study was projected to take 18 months and use no money from Pittsburgh Regional Transit's operating budget. The study resulted in planning for the new University Line. Rerouting existing bus routes and implementing other system changes began in October 2023. The first phase of construction began in Downtown Pittsburgh on September 13, 2023, and was completed in Summer 2025. The second phase of construction started in Uptown and Oakland in January 2025 and is expected to be completed in 2027.

===== West Busway routes =====
Route	Route Name	Destination	Service	Notes
28X	Airport Flyer	Pittsburgh International Airport	Daily, stop restrictions	Additional stops near Robinson Towne Center.
G2	West Busway–All Stops	Carnegie to Steel Plaza station	Daily	Does not go to East Busway
G3	Moon Flyer	Moon to East Busway at Penn Station	Weekday peak periods	Makes stops along Cherrington Parkway
G31	Bridgeville Flyer	Bridgeville to East Busway at Penn Station	Weekday peak periods	Makes stops along Washington Pike

===== East Busway routes =====
As of February 2024, the Pittsburgh Regional Transit bus routes that use the East Busway are as follows:

Route	Route Name	Destination	Service	Notes
P1	East Busway–All Stops	Swissvale station	Daily, all-day service	East Busway
P3	East Busway–Oakland	5th Av & Robinson St	Weekdays only	Neville St/5th Av
P7	McKeesport Flyer	McKeesport Transportation Center	Weekday peak hours only, stop restrictions	Edgewood Av/Rankin Bl/Kennywood Bl
P10	Allegheny Valley Flyer	Harrison	Weekday peak hours only, stop restrictions	Route 28/Freeport Rd
P12	Holiday Park Flyer	Holiday Park	Weekday peak hours only, stop restrictions	Penn Av/Parkway East/Golden Mile Hwy
P16	Penn Hills Flyer	Alpha Ice Complex, Harmar	Weekday peak hours only, stop restrictions	Leechburg Rd or Universal Rd
P17	Lincoln Park Flyer	Nadine	Weekday peak hours only, stop restrictions	Lincoln Av/Mt Carmel Rd
P67	Monroeville Flyer	Monroeville Mall	Weekday peak hours only, stop restrictions	William Penn Hwy
P68	Braddock Hills Flyer	Forbes Hospital	Daily, all-day service, stop restrictions	Brinton Rd/Braddock Av/James St
P69	Trafford Flyer	Viaduct Way, Trafford	Weekday peak hours only, stop restrictions	Ardmore Bl/Airbrake Av/Broadway Bl
P71	Swissvale Flyer	Swissvale station	Weekday peak hours only, stop restrictions	Savannah Av/Braddock Av/Woodstock Av
P76	Lincoln Highway Flyer	Olympia Park and Ride	Weekday peak hours only, stop restrictions	Ardmore Bl/Lincoln Hwy/Long Run Rd
P78	Oakmont Flyer	Alpha Ice Complex, Harmar	Weekdays only, stop restrictions	Laketon Rd/Verona Rd/Allegheny River Bl

===== I-279 HOV Bus routes (North suburbs) =====
Pittsburgh Regional Transit operates three "Flyer" bus routes using the HOV lanes during weekday peak commute periods.

I-279 HOV Flyer routes
Route	Route Name	Destination	Service	Notes
O1	Ross Flyer	Ross to East Busway at Penn Station	Weekday peak periods	Express to Ross Park Mall. No stops on McKnight Road
O5	Thompson Run Flyer	North Park to East Busway at Penn Station	Weekday peak periods	Makes most stops on local side roads - follows Babcock Boulevard and Thompson Run Road
O12	McKnight Flyer	McCandless to East Busway at Penn Station	Weekday peak periods	Primarily follows McKnight Road

===== South Busway routes =====
Nine routes travel the busway. The Yellow colored "Y" routes serve the length of the busway, entering and exiting at its southern terminus at Glenbury station. Four local routes (39 Brookline, 40 Mt Washington, 41 Bower Hill, and 44 Knoxville) branch of off the busway to serve city neighborhoods. From north to south, all routes use the Mount Washington Transit Tunnel, Routes 40 and 44 enter and exit the busway at Warrington Avenue (just before Palm Garden station), route 41 enters and exits using a spur ramp to Liberty Avenue serving Dawn station before returning to city streets, and route 39 enters and exits at a ramp to Pioneer Avenue just before the Pioneer Station.

Route	Route Name	Destination	Service	Notes
39	Brookline	Brookline	Daily	
40	Mt. Washington	Duquesne Heights	Daily	
41	Bower Hill	Bridgeville	Daily	
44	Knoxville	St. Clair/Baldwin	Daily	
Y1	Large Flyer	Large to Forbes Ave/Smithfield St	Weekday peak	Follows same routing as Y46, but has stop restrictions and makes fewer stops on Route 51.
Y45	Baldwin Manor Flyer	South Park to Forbes Ave/Smithfield St	Weekday peak	
Y46	Elizabeth Flyer	Elizabeth to Wood Street	Daily	Select weekday trips serve Large Park and Ride.
Y47	Curry Flyer	CCAC South to Wood Street	Mon–Sat	Weekday trips extend to CCAC South.
Y49	Prospect Flyer	CCAC South to Wood Street	Daily	
Red	Red Line	Station Square to Dawn station	Daily	Light rail tracks are on the busway
Blue	Blue Line	Station Square, South Hills Junction, and South Bank station only	Daily	Light rail tracks are on the busway
Silver	Silver Line	Station Square, South Hills Junction, and South Bank station only	Daily	Light rail tracks are on the busway

==== Airport bus service ====
The 28X Airport Flyer bus service connects Pittsburgh to Pittsburgh International Airport via the West Busway with pickup points at the Sheraden station, Wood Street station in Downtown Pittsburgh and at 5th Avenue/McPherson Street in the University District (Oakland) and several other locations per the Pittsburgh Regional Transit website..

=== Taxis ===
Yellow Cab of Pittsburgh is the main taxicab company in Pittsburgh, with over 300 vehicles in its fleet, all later model sedans and vans in good, PUC-inspected condition, as mandated by the Public Utility Commission of Pennsylvania. Most of the cabs are leased by drivers, but a very slight few are owner-operated. In addition to the typical Yellow Cab vehicles, there is a Green Cab (ecologically green), a few Pink Cabs (to promote breast cancer awareness), a Red Cab (to promote heart health) and a couple Blue Cabs (to promote prostate health). Cabs which bear the designation "METRO" on their tail ends denote probationary cab drivers, who are required to drive Metros until at least one month has passed since the end of their training; the actual amount of time before a new driver may drive a "Yellow" is determined on a case-by-case basis. The main distinction between a "Yellow" and a "Metro" is that Metro drivers are encouraged to learn to work the town, by not being permitted at the airport.

=== Inclines and Funiculars ===
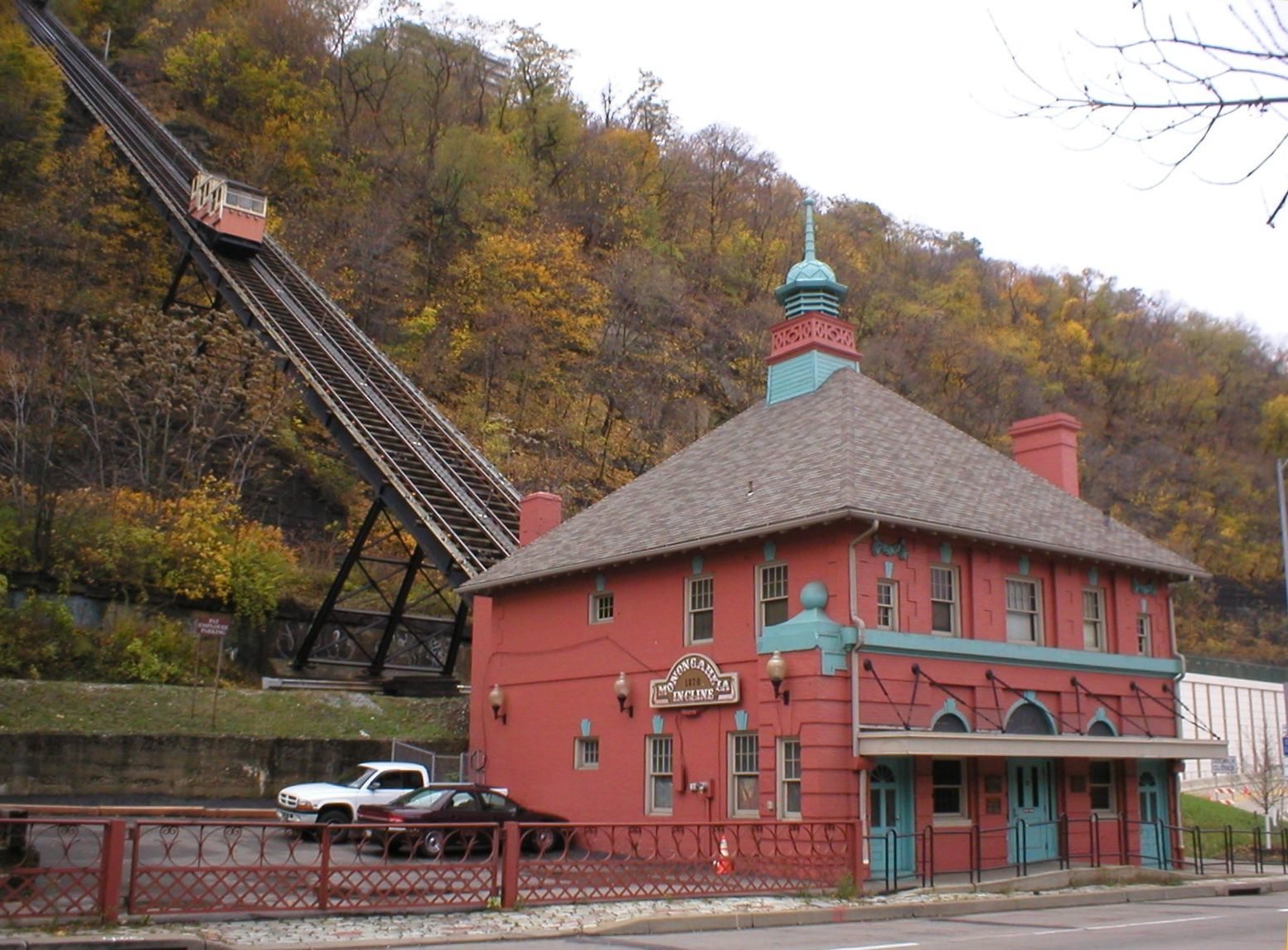
Lower station of the Monongahela Incline.

Two inclines ascend Mount Washington: Duquesne Incline and Monongahela Incline. Pittsburgh had considerably more inclines, and a freight incline parallelled the Monongahela Incline.

=== Riverboat ===
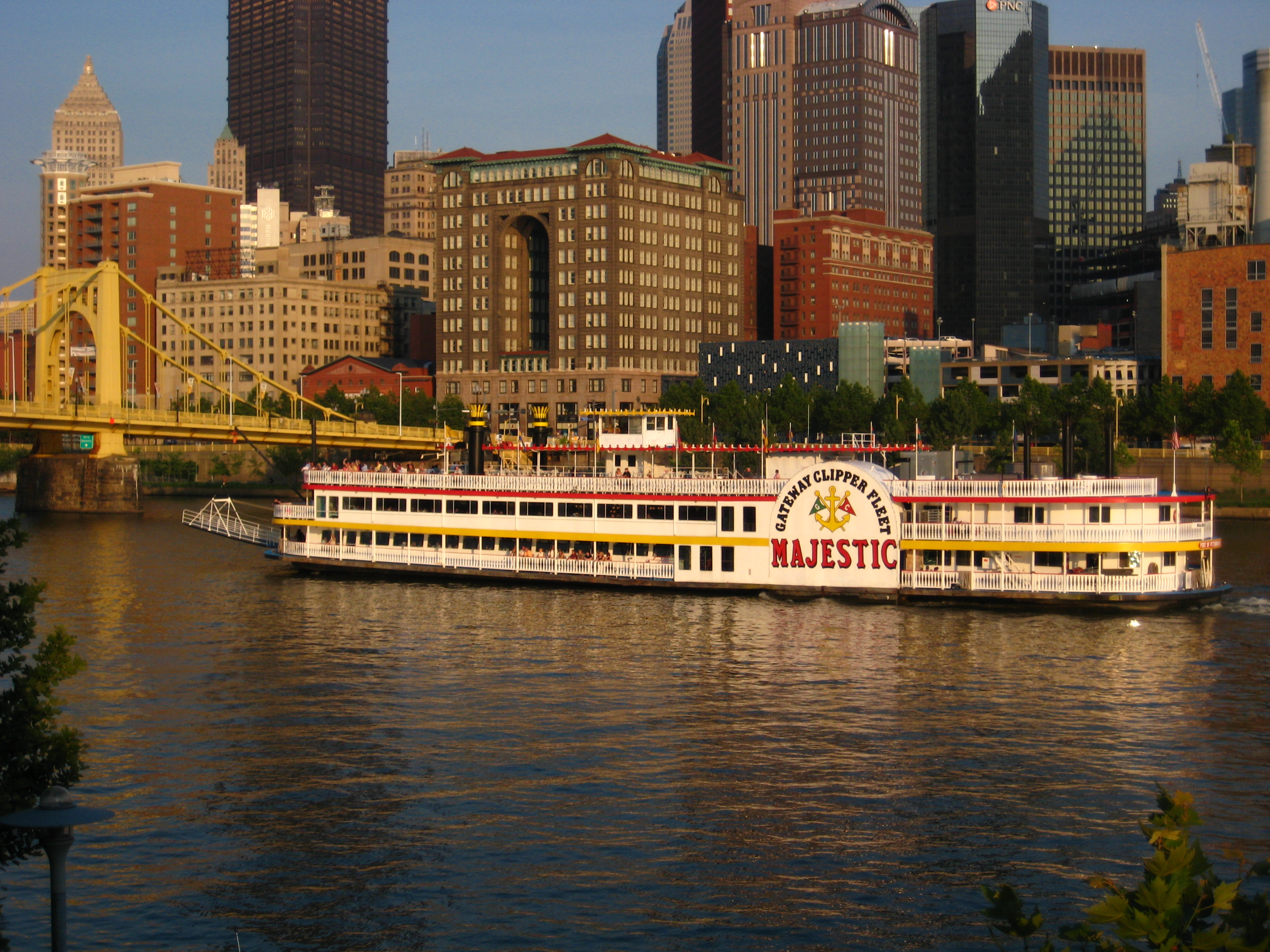
The Gateway Clipper fleet's PS Majestic

The Gateway Clipper Fleet is believed to be the largest inland riverboat fleet in the United States. It offers shuttle services to PNC Park and Acrisure Stadium on days of Pittsburgh Pirates, Pittsburgh Steelers, and Pitt Panthers home games.

The fleet was once moored at the Monongahela Wharf, but since the 1980s has been moored at Station Square, where the dock and loading bay are.

Today there are six ships in the fleet:

Ship name	Passenger capacity	Size (length vs width in feet)	Year joined the fleet	Former name(s)	Notes
Majestic	1,000	227 X 50	1987	n/a	fleet flagship, houses main kitchen for entire fleet
Empress	600	212 X 50	1966	Party Liner	a barge pushed by a towboat named the Empress II
Princess	400	120 X 35	1999	Keystone Belle	all-steel traditional paddlewheel with floor-to-ceiling windows
Three Rivers Queen	338	110 X 32	2013	Arkansas Queen	3-deck paddlewheel built in 1994
Duchess	310	125 X 35	1975	Liberty Bell	built in 1965, now carries most "Good Ship Lollipop" named cruises
Countess	150	55 X 14	1979	City of Champions; Good Ship Lollipop	open air riverboat, fleet's fastest ship

== Intercity travel ==
=== International airport ===
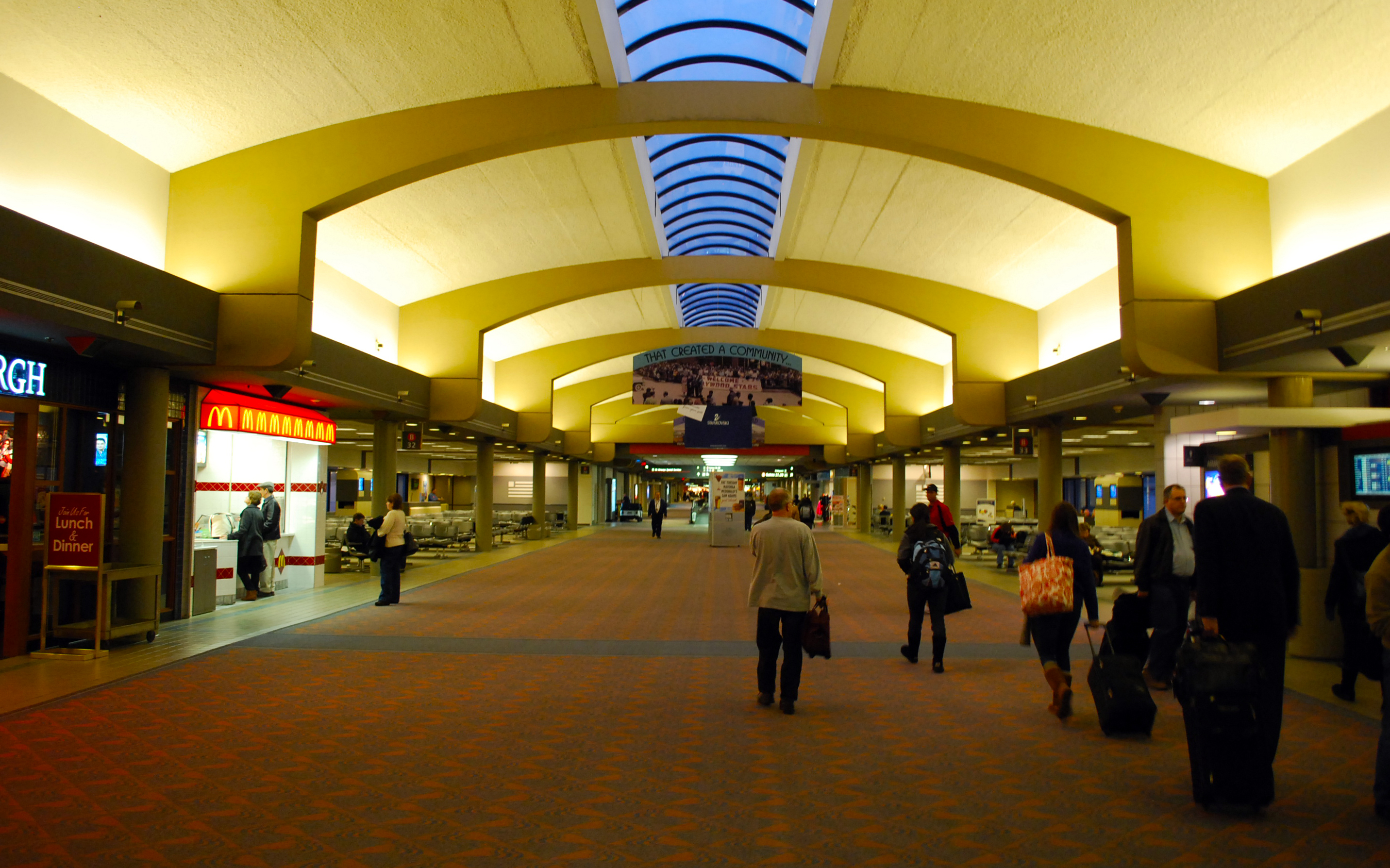
Pittsburgh International Airport concourse B

The city is primarily served by Pittsburgh International Airport in suburban Findlay Township, Pennsylvania, formerly a hub and key focus city for US Airways. The airport is reachable by the 28X Airport Flyer bus service to and from the West Busway Sheraden station, Wood Street station in Downtown Pittsburgh and at 5th Avenue/McPherson Street in the University District (Oakland) and several other locations per the Pittsburgh Regional Transit website..

The busiest domestic routes from Pittsburgh International Airport are as follows:

Busiest domestic routes from PIT (January 2025 - December 2025)
Rank	City	Passengers	Carriers
1	(Georgia (U.S. state)) Atlanta, Georgia	370,520	Delta, Southwest
2	Chicago–O'Hare, Illinois	300,590	American, United
3	Orlando, Florida	286,830	Frontier, Southwest, Spirit
4	Charlotte, North Carolina	247,010	American
5	Denver, Colorado	237,430	Frontier, Southwest, United
6	Dallas/Fort Worth, Texas	200,650	American
7	(New York (state)) New York–LaGuardia, New York	188,550	American, Delta
8	Boston, Massachusetts	168,830	Delta, JetBlue
9	Fort Lauderdale, Florida	144,320	Southwest, Spirit
10	Newark, New Jersey	143,520	Spirit, United

The largest airlines serving Pittsburgh International Airport are as follows:

Largest airlines at PIT (February 2024 - January 2025)
Rank	Airline	Passengers	Share
1	Southwest Airlines	2,465,000	26.05%
2	American Airlines	1,533,000	16.20%
3	Republic Airways	1,100,000	11.63%
4	Spirit Airlines	939,000	9.93%
5	Delta Air Lines	912,000	9.64%

=== Regional airports ===
Other area airports also serve Pittsburgh. General aviation is served by the Allegheny County Airport. Its terminal is of a 1920s art-deco design. It once hosted Charles Lindbergh and handles 139,000 private and corporate-jet flights a year.

The Arnold Palmer Regional Airport served as a general aviation and secondary reliever airport in the eastern suburb of Latrobe, Pennsylvania. In 2027, Breeze Airways plans to offer services to Myrtle Beach, South Carolina. In the past, the airport offered services from US Airways, Northwest Airlines, and Delta Air Lines.

Other area airports include:

Area	Name	IATA airport code	ICAO airport code
North Metro	Butler County Airport	BTP	KBTP
North Metro	Zelienople Municipal Airport	PJC	KPJC
North Metro	Pittsburgh Northeast Airport	none	none
North Metro	New Castle Municipal Airport	UCP	KUCP
North Metro	Lakehill Airport	none	none
South Metro	Allegheny County Airport	AGC	KAGC
South Metro	Rostraver Airport	FWQ	KFWQ
South Metro	Joseph A. Hardy Connellsville Airport	VVS	KVVS
South Metro	Washington County Airport	none	none
East Metro	Arnold Palmer Regional Airport	none	none
East Metro	Greensburg Jeannette Regional Airport	none	none
East Metro	Indiana County-Jimmy Stewart Airport	IDI	KIDI
West Metro	Beaver County Airport	BFP	KBVI
West Metro	Eddie Dew Memorial Airpark (Ohio)	none	none
West Metro	Jefferson County Airpark (Ohio)	none	none
West Metro	Herron Airport (West Virginia)	none	none
West Metro	Wheeling Airport (West Virginia)	HLG	KHLG

=== Intercity bus terminal ===
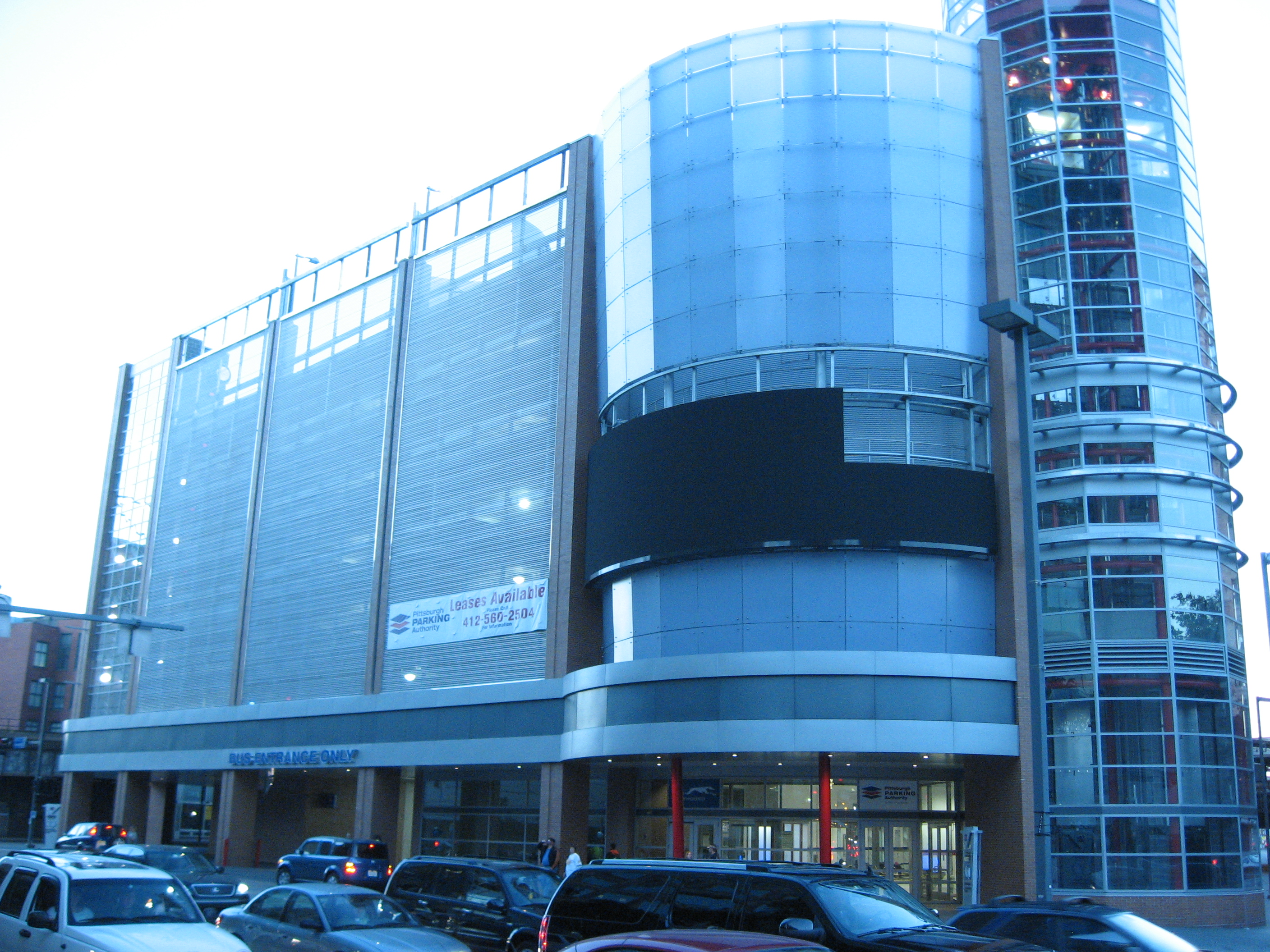
Pittsburgh's Greyhound bus terminal

Megabus, Greyhound Lines, and Fullington Trailways connect Pittsburgh with distant cities by bus; Greyhound and Fullington Trailways buses stop at the Grant Street Transportation Center intercity bus terminal. Popular destinations include Philadelphia, New York City, and Washington, D.C.

=== Intercity passenger rail terminal ===
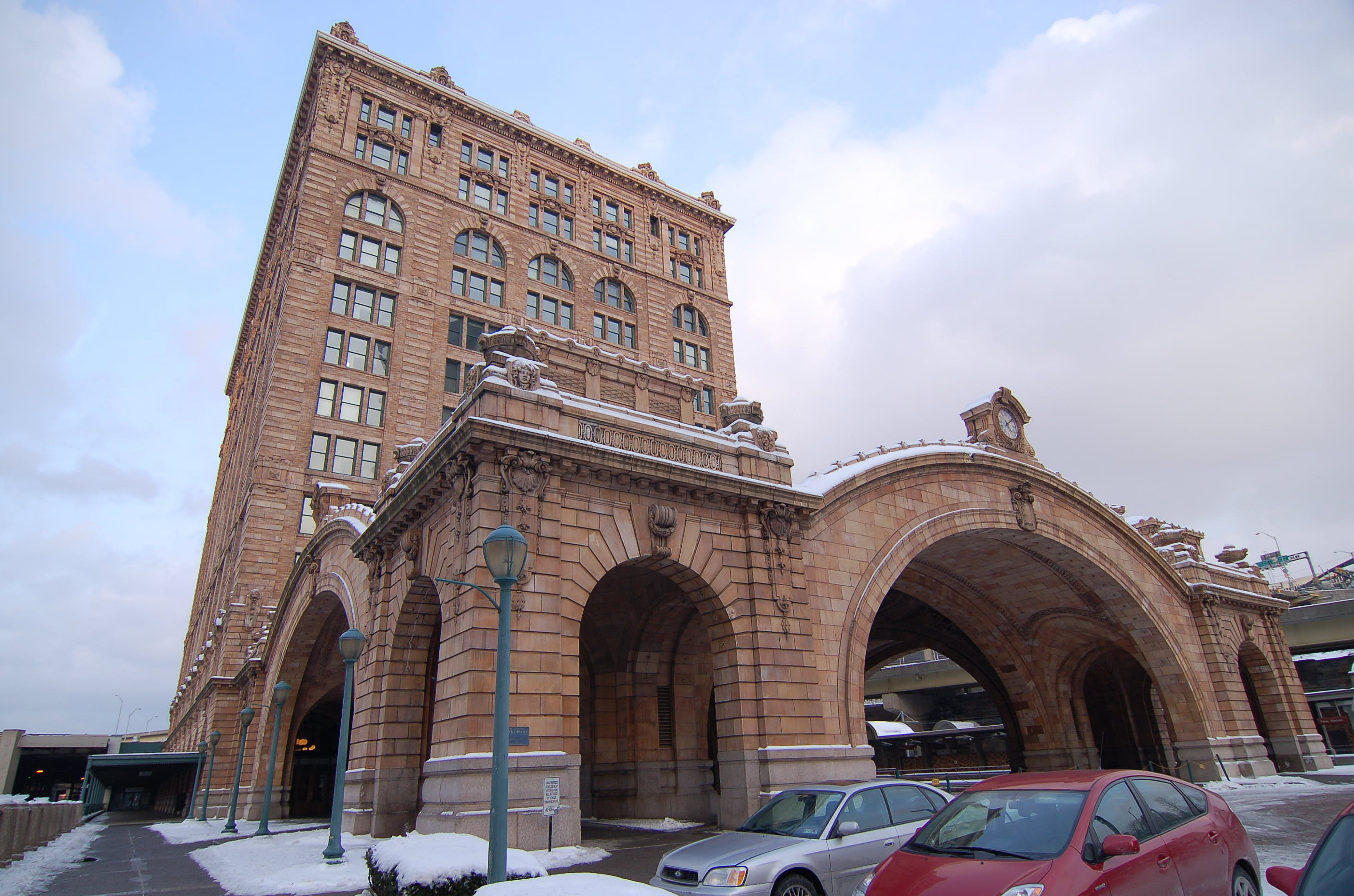
Pittsburgh Union Station

Two Amtrak trains serve Penn Station: the Pennsylvanian to New York City via Philadelphia, and the Capitol Limited between Washington, D.C. and Chicago, which uses CSX from Washington to Pittsburgh's outer perimeter, the AVR on the P&W Subdivision through the Panther Hollow Tunnel in the university district, and NS from the AVR interchange through Penn Station to Chicago.

Train	Terminals		Frequency	Stations	Route length
Pennsylvanian	New York City	Pittsburgh	Daily	17	444 miles (715 km)
Capitol Limited	Chicago	Washington	Daily	14	780 miles (1,260 km)

== Pedestrians and bicycling ==
=== Pedestrian staircases ===
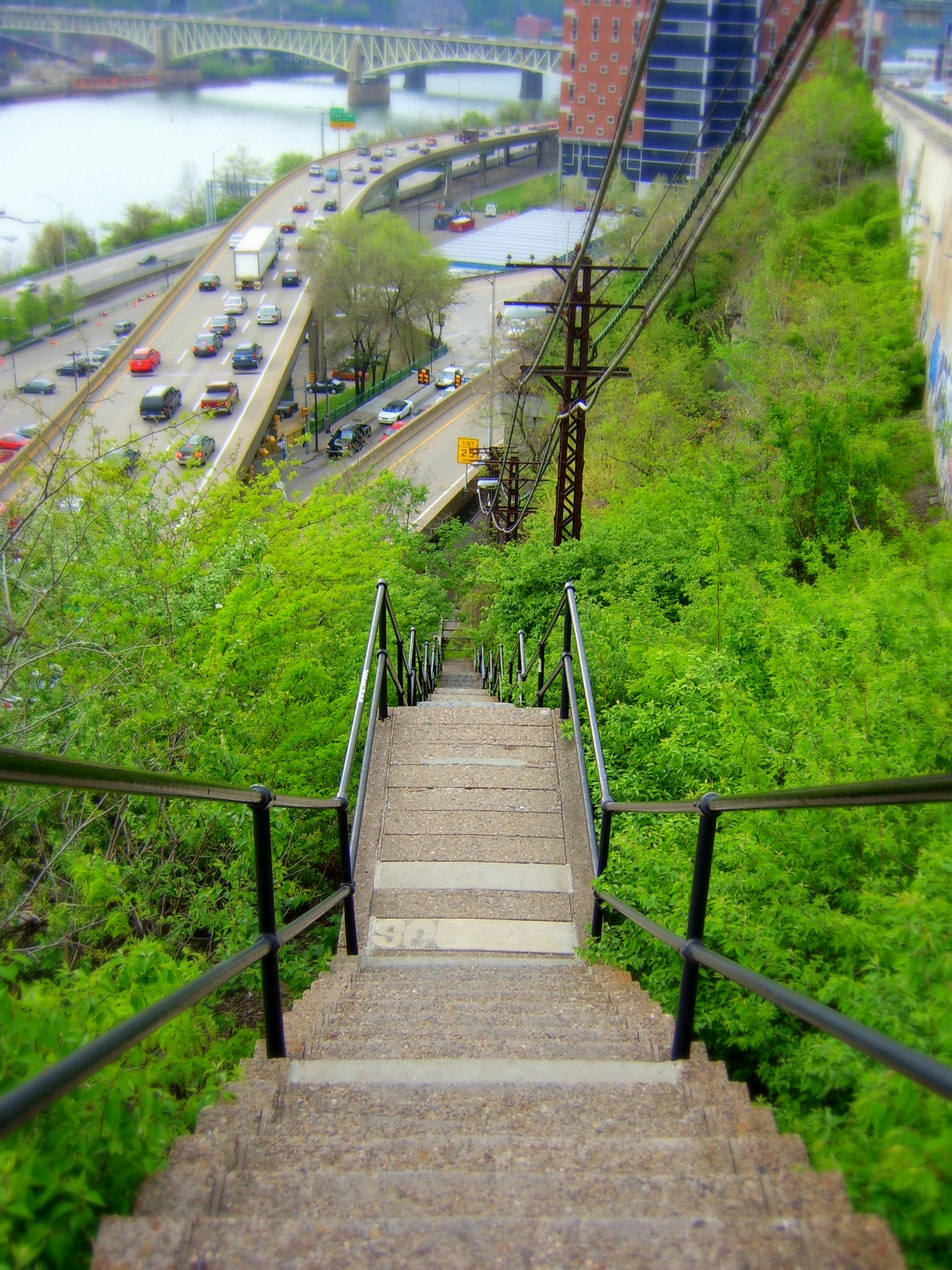
Public staircase at Duquesne University.

Pittsburgh has more public staircases (737) than any other city in the United States, followed by Cincinnati and San Francisco. Many of these staircases have street names, and lead to hillside neighborhoods that can be difficult to access by car in winter.

The large number of steps is an engineering approach to the topography upon which the City of Pittsburgh is built. According to author Martin Aurand, Pittsburgh "lies unevenly on unruly land". The city is located at the confluence of two rivers which cut through elevated land of the Appalachian Plateau. The city is settled at elevations ranging from 710 to 1,300 feet (220 to 400 m) above sea level.

=== Pedestrian trails ===
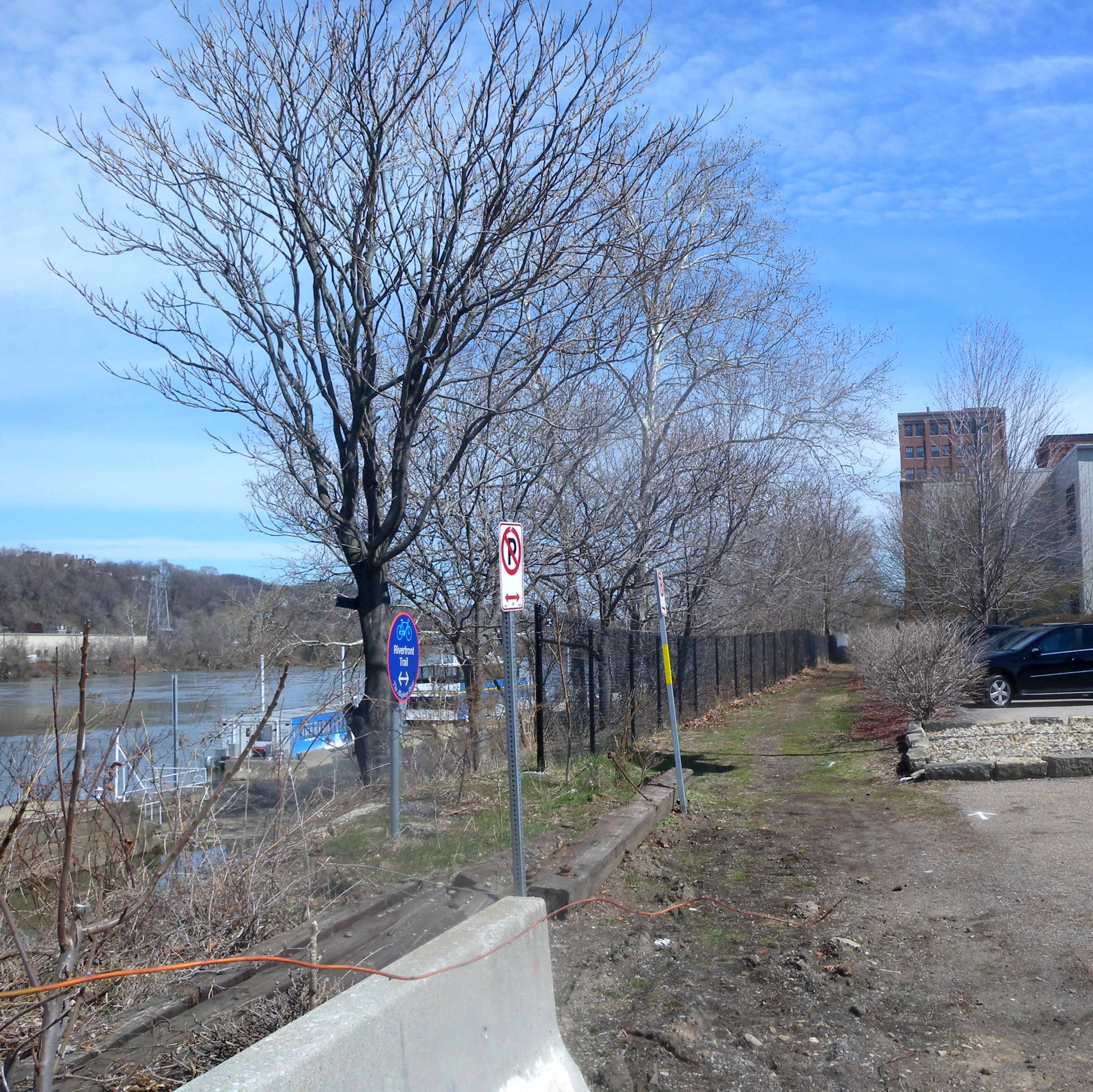
Unpaved portion of the Three Rivers Heritage Trail in Strip District

Pittsburgh has a thriving cycling community despite steep hills and variable weather. Efforts have been made to incorporate the bicycle into the transportation system. The Three Rivers Heritage Trail encompasses all the trails in the city. The Eliza Furnace Trail, known locally as the "Jail Trail", stretches from downtown (at the Allegheny County Jail) to the East End region, where trail access can be found along some roads. The North Shore Trail spans from the Alcosan plant along the Ohio River and continues along the Allegheny River to Millvale. The Southside Trail follows the Monongahela River and, beyond Baldwin Borough, connects to McKeesport via the Great Allegheny Passage. This trail, in connection with the C&O Canal Trail, forms a continuous motorist-free route from Point State Park in Pittsburgh to Washington, D.C. PAT has installed bike racks on all buses. It allows bikes on its subway/busway system at all times.

=== Bicycles ===
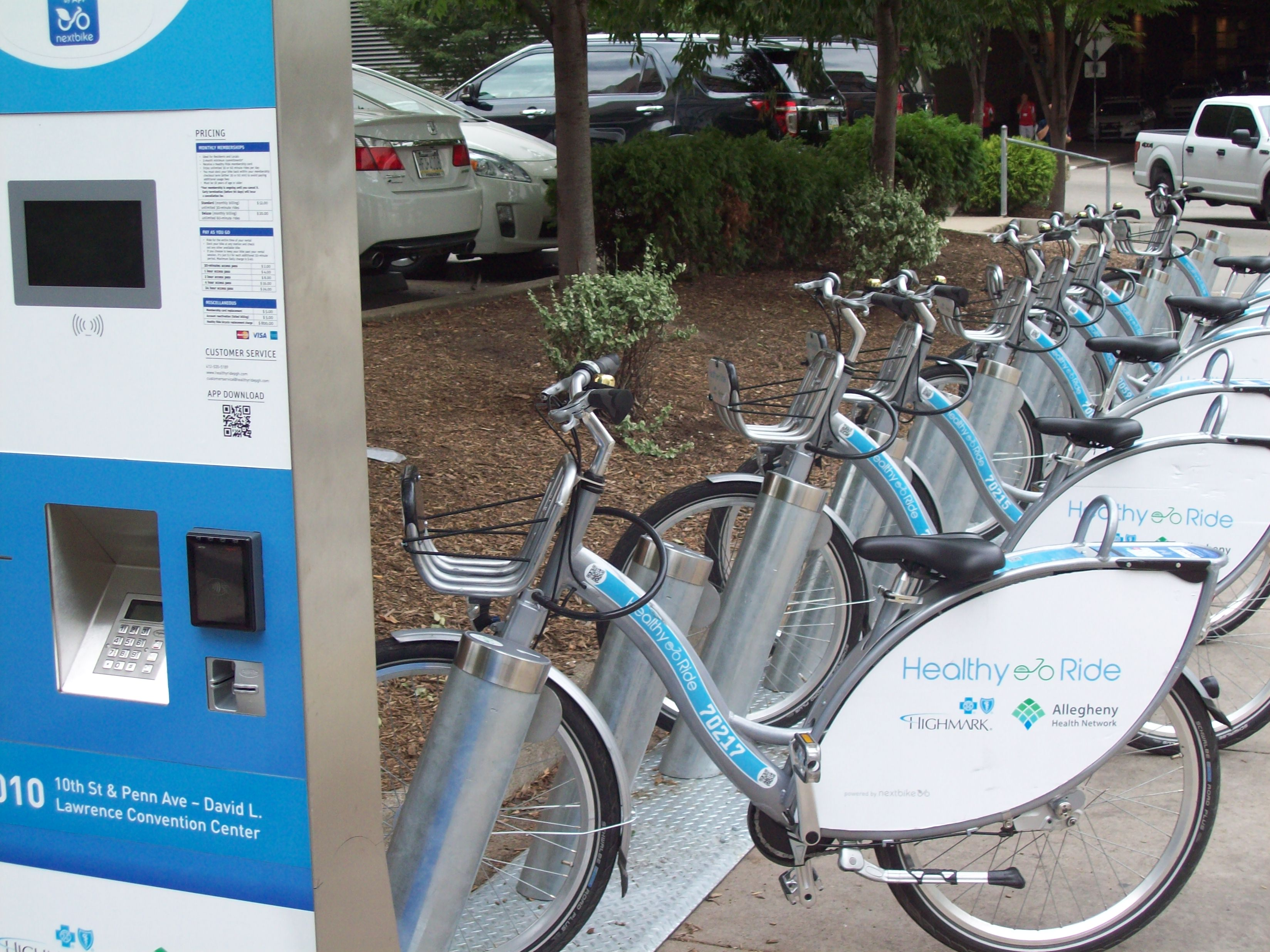
Healthy Ride station

Bike Pittsburgh (BikePGH) is the local bicycle advocacy group and is working to make Pittsburgh increasingly safe, accessible, and friendly to bicycle transportation. The non-profit bike collective, Free Ride, recycles bicycles and bike parts, teaches bicycle construction, and has programs to sell or earn a rebuilt bicycle. Additionally, bicycles can be borrowed at two places along the Heritage Trail through the Friends of the Riverfront/Dasani Blue Bikes program.

In 2014, the city began installing segregated bike lanes, which provide greater physical safety for bikers. On September 6, bike lanes that stretch from Downtown Pittsburgh to the 16th Street Bridge on Penn Avenue were installed. To accommodate these bike lanes, the Westbound lane of Penn Avenue was removed, making it one-way. Other segregated bike lanes were installed on Schenley Drive in Oakland, and Saline Street in Greenfield.

The "Healthy Ride" bicycle-sharing system entered service in Spring 2016, supplied by Nextbike. The price was $2 per half-hour, or $12 or $20 per month. In 2022, the system went through a full rebrand and is now known as POGOH. The equipment and software are acquired through PBSC, an industry leader in bikeshare.

== Freight Transportation ==
=== Road based freight transport ===
The Pittsburgh area is the headquarters of several known trucking and shipping organizations. The Interstate highways I-76, I-79, I-70, and I-68 are the "four major interstates" serving Pittsburgh and the Greater Pittsburgh region.

==== Aurora ====
Aurora, a self-driving truck company is based in the Strip District of Pittsburgh.

==== FedEx Ground ====
FedEx Ground Package System, Inc., also known simply as FedEx Ground, is an American ground package delivery company headquartered in Moon Township, Pennsylvania, a suburb of Pittsburgh. It is a subsidiary of the FedEx Corporation. The company began as Roadway Package System (RPS), founded in 1985 by transportation company Roadway Services Inc., later renamed Caliber System. FedEx bought Caliber in 1998 to complement its existing FedEx Express business and rebranded Caliber's RPS package delivery service FedEx Ground in 2000.

FedEx Ground provides US and Canada domestic services as well as international services between the two, branded FedEx International Ground. Its services are cheaper than the time-definite services offered by FedEx Express and its drivers are primarily owner/operators, independent contractors who control individual delivery routes and territories. In addition to its core commercial package services, the company's services include FedEx Home Delivery, a US residential delivery service, and FedEx Ground Economy (formerly FedEx SmartPost), a low-cost parcel consolidation service.

==== Pitt Ohio ====
Pitt Ohio Express, LLC, stylized PITT OHIO, is a privately owned transportation and supply chain management company based in Pittsburgh that serves the Mid-Atlantic and Midwestern US. Pitt Ohio ranked 48th on Transport Topics Top 100 For-Hire list and 14th on its Top Less-Than-Truckload (LTL) Carriers list of US and Canadian freight carriers by revenue for 2021.

=== Air cargo ===
In addition to passenger services, Pittsburgh International Airport has a sizeable freight business, with a Free-trade zone of 5,000 acres (20 km^{2}), access to three class-one railroad freight lines, one interstate highway, and a location a few miles from the nation's second largest inland port and within 500 miles of 80% of the nation's population. Four cargo buildings provide more than 183,000 square feet (17,001 m^{2}) of warehouse capacity and over 450,000 square feet (41,806 m^{2}) of apron space. The airport has begun construction on a new 80,000 sq ft cargo facility with 17 truck loading docks and enough apron space for two Boeing 747 freighters to be loaded or unloaded simultaneously. The facility is scheduled to open in 2024.

Cargo traffic has increased considerably in recent years as airport officials have pitched Pittsburgh to cargo carriers as a more efficient alternative to clogged hubs like New York and Chicago. In 2017, Qatar Airways launched twice-weekly cargo service at Pittsburgh, backed by $1.5 million in subsidies. The effort was not very successful at first as Qatar failed to meet tonnage goals, and in December 2019 the route was suspended. However, Qatar resumed the flight in 2020 without any subsidies, and as of 2022 had increased operations to 3-4 flights per week. Several new cargo carriers began service to Pittsburgh in 2020 and 2021, including Cathay Pacific, SpiceXpress, and Amazon Air. In 2021, nearly 250 million pounds of cargo goods touched down at PIT, the largest figure since 2004 and a 30% increase over 2020.

The world's leading caterer for air and business, LSG SkyChefs, in 2007 chose Pittsburgh as its sole Western Hemisphere manufacturing facility. It expanded its customer service center on the cargo side of the airport by 20,000 square feet (1,900 m^{2}) and now employs over 100 people with the capacity of making nearly 25 million meals per year for distribution to flights all over the Americas. LSG SkyChefs cited the region's strategic location for air and truck transport to major suppliers and customers, as well as the airport's excellent record in maintaining and expanding capacity.

In 2021, FedEx accounted for 50% of all cargo traffic at the airport, followed by UPS at 33% and Amazon Air at 5%. In 2024, FedEx's share dropped to 45% while UPS's increased to 33% and Amazon Air's increased to 15%. British Airways accounted for 3% of total freight in 2024 by hauling cargo on its passenger planes.

The following carriers fly out of Pittsburgh International Airport.

Airlines	Destinations	Refs
Amazon Air	Fort Worth/Alliance, Lakeland	
FedEx Express	Indianapolis, Memphis	
UPS Airlines	Louisville, Philadelphia, Richmond	

=== Waterways and barges ===
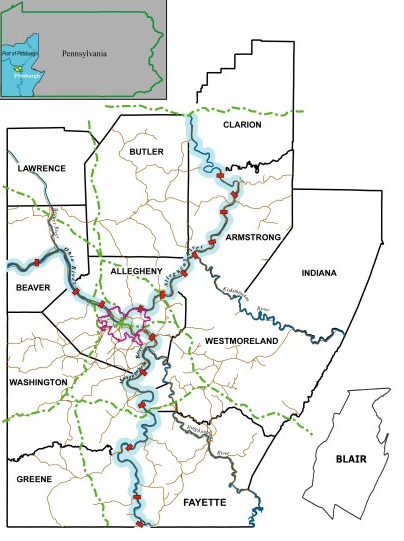
Map shows general area of the Pittsburgh port region.

In 2010, the federal Maritime Administration designated the Ohio River as part of a federal marine highway, called M-70, with the name taken from I-70, a major highway used by trucks in the region.

Pittsburgh is "...connected to much of the country and, ultimately, the world’s oceans through the Mississippi, which collides with the Ohio at the southern tip of Illinois."

The Port of Pittsburgh Commission has responsibility for Ohio River shipping within Pennsylvania and the navigable portions of the Allegheny River and the Monongahela River. It is a government agency of the Commonwealth of Pennsylvania that manages the Port of Pittsburgh, which is the second-largest inland port in the United States. Pittsburgh's port ranks as the 26th largest port in the United States overall, with almost 27 million short tons of river cargo for 2015. The port ranked 15th largest in the U.S. when measured in domestic trade.

The Port of Pittsburgh is a vast river traffic region in southwestern Pennsylvania. It spans a thirteen-county area including Allegheny, Armstrong, Beaver, Blair, Butler, Cambria, Clarion, Fayette, Greene, Indiana, Lawrence, Washington, and Westmoreland Counties.

It encompasses more than 200 miles of commercially navigable waterways in southwestern Pennsylvania, including the three major rivers in this region: the Allegheny, the Monongahela, and the Ohio. These waterways are made navigable by a system of seventeen locks and dams. The Port of Pittsburgh supports nearly 200 river terminals and barge industry service suppliers, including privately owned public river terminals. The port complex is served by the CSX and Norfolk Southern railroads and by four interstate highways. The Port of Pittsburgh Commission acts as a comprehensive service for shippers and industries seeking information on the river system.

==== Route M-70 ====
The Port of Pittsburgh Commission has responsibility for Ohio River shipping within Pennsylvania and the navigable portions of the Allegheny River and the Monongahela River. In 2010, the federal Maritime Administration designated the Ohio River as part of a federal marine highway, called M-70, with the name taken from I-70, a major highway used by trucks in the region.

==== Ohio River ====
The Ohio River is extensively industrialized and populated. Regular barge traffic carries cargoes of oil, steel and other industrial goods produced in the region. The Ohio is one of the more important inland waterways of the United States, maintained by the U.S. Army Corps of Engineers as part of its Mississippi River System. Major cities located along the northern and southern banks of the river include Pittsburgh, Pennsylvania; Cincinnati, Ohio; Louisville, Kentucky; and Evansville, Indiana.

==== Allegheny River ====
While the Allegheny River is primarily a recreational waterway, it still sees some barge traffic and is navigable to milepost 89.5.

==== Monongahela River ====
The Monongahela River sees major commercial and industrial traffic to transport coal, coke, iron, and steel.

=== Railroads ===
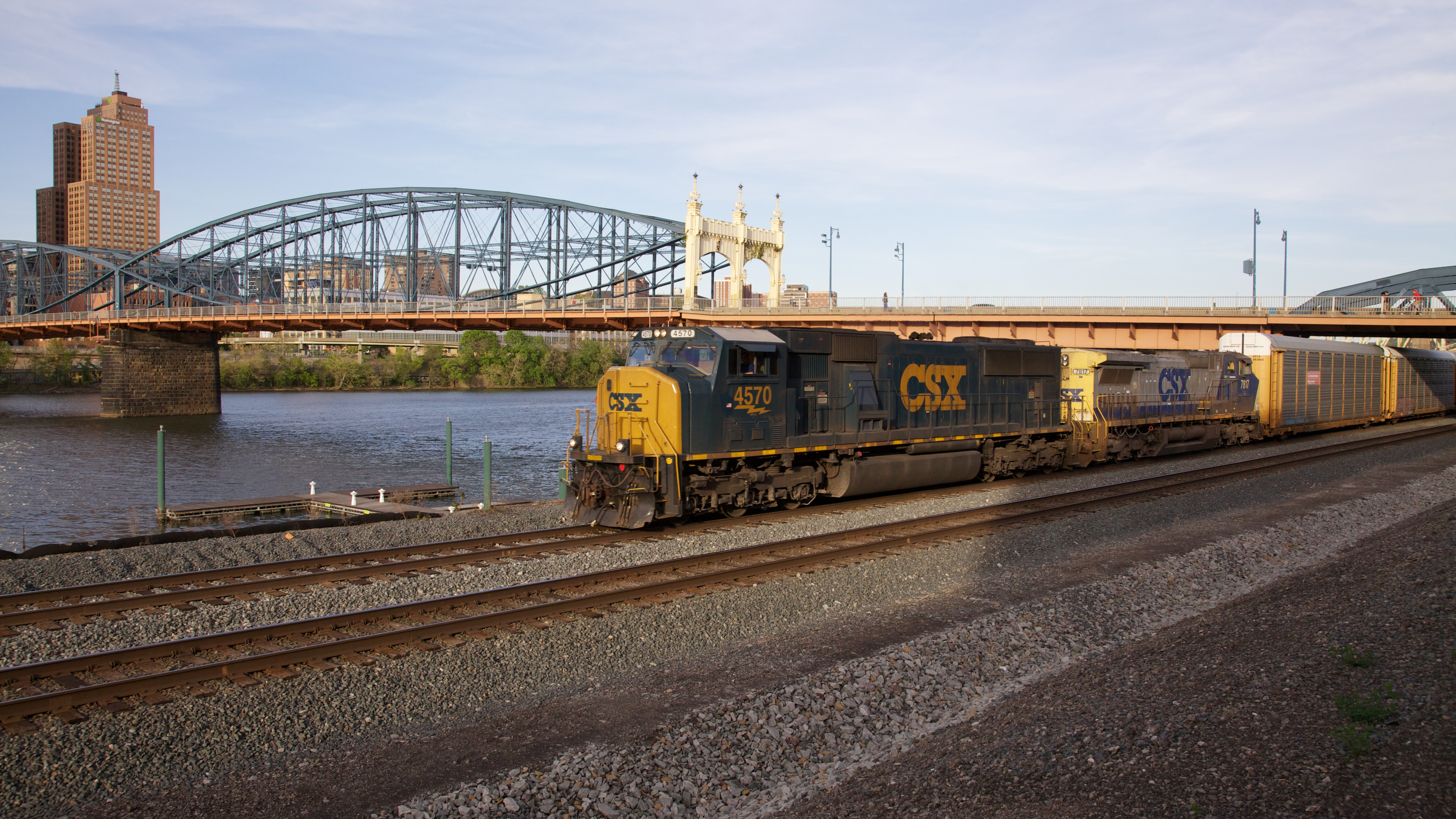
CSX train crossing under the Smithfield Bridge in Pittsburgh

During the heyday of the steel industry, Pittsburgh was among the largest rail centers not only in the nation, but the world. For many years, the multiple rail crossings in the suburb of Port Perry at the mouth of Turtle Creek on the Monongahela River and adjacent to the Edgar Thomson Works and Duquesne mills, was the highest concentration of freight traffic in the world. Even today, with river traffic included, Port Perry is often very near or at the top of the list. The Conway Yard to the west of the city along the Ohio River was the largest rail yard in the world from 1956 until 1980. From the beginning of the industrial era in America through its collapse in the 1980s, Pittsburgh was a key market for the nation's largest and most important railroads (most notably the Pennsylvania Railroad [the largest company in the world for much of the 20th century], and the New York Central Railroad [via the Pittsburgh & Lake Erie], Baltimore and Ohio Railroad and Pittsburgh & West Virginia). Despite the near-complete collapse of heavy industry in the Northeast, Pittsburgh remains an extremely important link in the nation's rail network. Current railroads in Pittsburgh include:

=== Class I railroads ===
==== Norfolk Southern (NS) ====
Norfolk Southern operates the former assets of Conrail, composed of the Pennsylvania Railroad, instrumental in the formation of modern Pittsburgh. NS operates three lines through Pittsburgh:

- the original line, the Pittsburgh Line, from U.S. Steel's Edgar Thomson Steel Mill in Braddock, PA, over the Allegheny River near Downtown Pittsburgh, into Island Ave Yard where it becomes the Fort Wayne Line;
- the Mon Line, along the south bank of the Monongahela River from West Brownsville, PA, to Island Ave Yard, formerly the Pittsburgh, Virginia and Charleston Railroad. This line is used by coal trains from southern Pennsylvania and trains with over-height cars that cannot fit under the roof of Penn Station on the Pittsburgh Line, accessing it via a branch just east of Braddock to the Port Perry bridge. The Mon Line joins the Fort Wayne Line at Island Ave Yard after crossing the Ohio River on the Ohio Connecting (OC) Railroad bridge;
- the Conemaugh Line, along the north shore of the Allegheny River, serving several coal branch lines and power plants. Operations are centered on a small yard in Etna, PA.

On the Mon and Pittsburgh lines, over 60 trains a day pass through the city.

==== CSX ====
CSX operates the former Baltimore and Ohio Railroad (B&O) and the Pittsburgh and Lake Erie Railroad (P&LE). Many of the old B&O lines have been removed or are unused. Formerly an important part of the B&O system, Glenwood Yard is leased and operated by the Allegheny Valley Railroad for local jobs. The yard used to give access to the B&O's Grant Street Station in Downtown Pittsburgh. The building has been rebuilt into a PNC Bank building, and the old right-of-way is now a bike path. The B&O main line, which runs north and under Pittsburgh via the Schenley Tunnel, is now used by the AVR. The 33rd Street Railroad Bridge over the Allegheny River is still used: AVR trains connect with Norfolk Southern's Pittsburgh Line about a mile east of Penn Station. CSX freight trains use the former P&LE through McKeesport, PA, and Braddock, PA, before crossing the Mononghela River into Homestead, PA. The P&LE line and the Mon Line run side by side until the Mon Line crosses the Ohio Connecting Railroad Bridge at McKees Rocks, Pennsylvania. On an average day, the P&LE line carries about 30–35 trains.

=== Class II railroads ===
The Wheeling & Lake Erie is a regional railroad incorporated in 1990 after the Norfolk and Western Railway sold trackage from the original Wheeling & Lake Erie Railroad.

The W&LE is the largest Ohio-based railroad and among the largest regional railroads in the country, with a service area that includes 840 miles of track in Ohio, West Virginia, Pennsylvania, and Maryland.

==== Bessemer & Lake Erie ====
The Bessemer & Lake Erie Railroad runs north from the North Bessemer Yard in Penn Hills to Conneaut, Ohio. In 2004, the B&LE was purchased by Canadian National Railway.

=== Class III railroads ===
==== Allegheny Valley Railroad ====
The Allegheny Valley Railroad runs mostly on former Pennsylvania Railroad and Baltimore and Ohio Railroad lines.

==== Pittsburgh and Ohio Central Railroad ====
The Pittsburgh and Ohio Central Railroad operates former Pennsylvania Railroad trackage on the Chartiers Branch and the Panhandle Route to the southwest.

==== Union Railroad ====
Union Railroad mainly serves the last remaining steel mills in the city. It has interchanges with the B&LE at North Bessemer.

== See also ==
- Plug-in electric vehicles in Pennsylvania § Pittsburgh
