= Roslyn Place (district) =

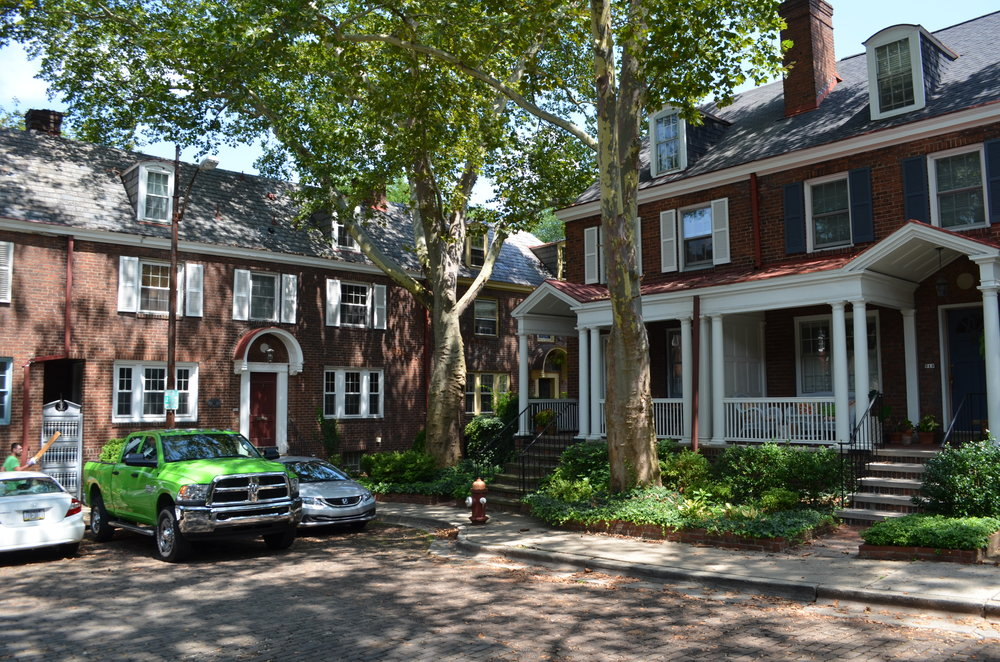

- Location within Pittsburgh
- 40°27′12.74″N 79°56′9.94″W
- Location: 506-523 & 525 Roslyn Place (Shadyside (Pittsburgh)), Pittsburgh, Pennsylvania, USA

History
- Built: 1914-1917

Site notes
- Architect: Thomas Rodd
- Governing body: Numerous Private Owners

Roslyn Place is a collection of houses located at 506-523 & 525 Roslyn Place in the Shadyside neighborhood of Pittsburgh, Pennsylvania. Built between 1914 and 1917 in the Colonial Revival and Georgian Revival architectural styles, the houses currently serve residential functions.

== History ==
Until the late 1800s the area that would become Roslyn Place was a lot owned by J.W. Friday. It included a single wooden house surrounded by four wooden outbuildings. By 1904 the property was owned by Thomas Rodd, and the adjacent land to the southwest was owned by M.W. Rodd and served as the home of the Rodd family. Thomas Rodd was born in London, England, and immigrated to the United States at the age of 5, and he served as an officer in the Navy during the American Civil War. Shortly afterwards he eventually joined the Pennsylvania Railroad Company where he would be appointed to chief engineer for all lines west of Pittsburgh in 1889. It was at this time that he moved to Pittsburgh, and the Rodd family quickly became members of Pittsburgh's social elite. He joined the Pittsburgh Club, the Duquesne Club, the Allegheny County Club, the Pittsburgh Golf Club, the University Club of Pittsburgh, the Metropolitan Club of New York, and the Chicago Club. The Rodd family was of such social status that even their vacations and work travel were reported in prominent newspapers. Thomas Rodd also played a role in the construction of many buildings in western Pennsylvania and the Midwest, and he was responsible for designing and constructing Roslyn Place. Rodd was also responsible for constructing the historic street which the houses sat on, also called Roslyn Place. In 1914 construction began when the City Council passed ordinance No. 181, which approved of Rodd's plans for the creation of Roslyn Place. In the same year the City Council passed ordinance No. 240, which authorized the purchase of a water pipe line connecting to Roslyn Place. This is representative of the progress and modernization that occurred with the new development. The construction continued for the next two years and finished in 1917, and the advertisements of the new development were published. The houses in the constructed neighborhood served as mainly rental properties owned by the Rodd family until the 1950s when the individual homes were sold. The houses continue to serve residential functions and the Roslyn Place neighborhood was nominated in October 2017 to become a City Historic District by Preservation Pittsburgh.

== Architecture ==
The district was designed by Thomas Rodd in the Colonial Revival architectural style, with significant Georgian Revival influences. Examples of the Colonial Revival style are rare in the city of Pittsburgh. The scale, uniformity, and quality of design are what make Roslyn Place's Colonial Revival elements exceptional. Roslyn Place also has significant Georgian Revival elements, and these can be seen with the symmetrical facades, the hemispherical hoods, the pediment porches, the use of brick, and the coffered design elements on the porches and hoods. The street Roslyn Place is also notable as an example of Nicolson pavement. The neighborhood's design and planning approach is widely recognized, most notably by acclaimed urban planner Allan Jacobs.

== Gallery ==
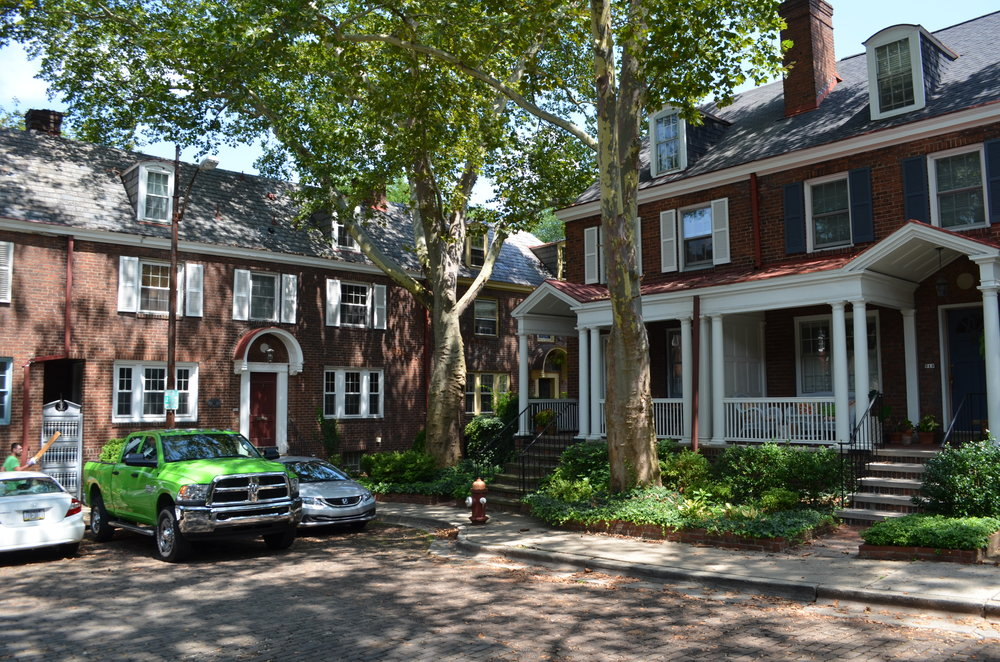
Photo of some of the houses in Roslyn Place

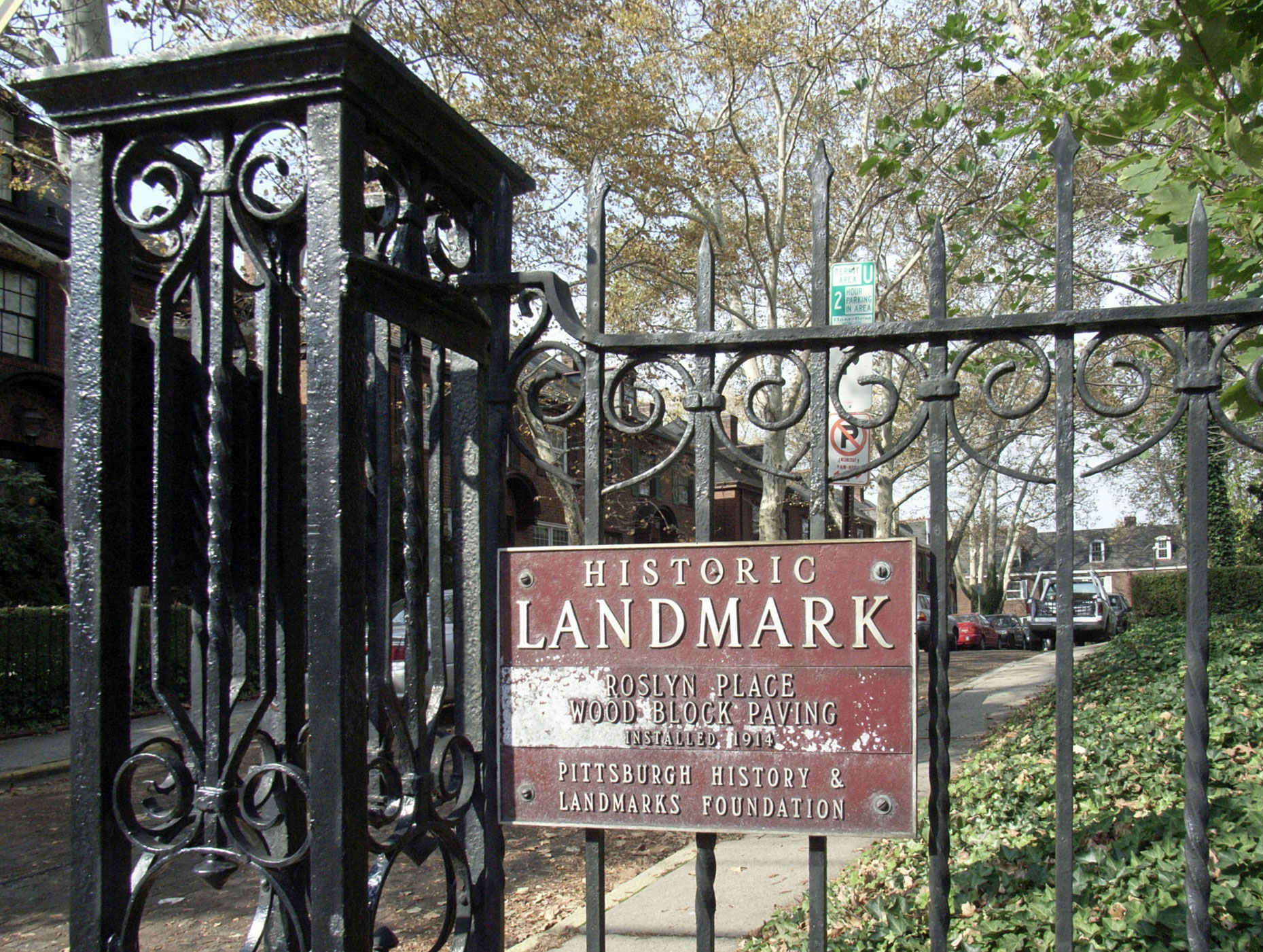
Photo of the Historic Landmark sign on the entrance to Roslyn Place

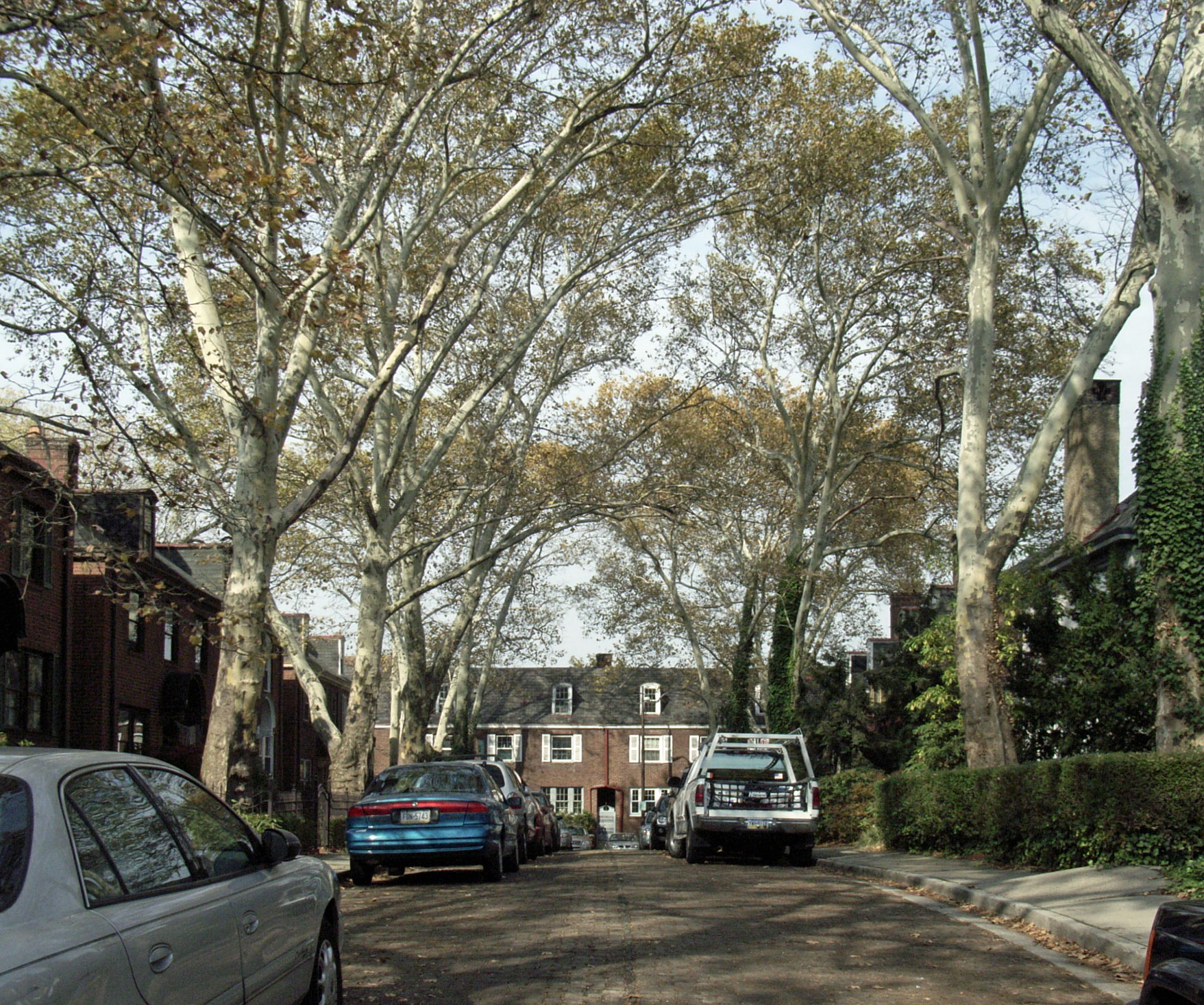
Photo of the Road and entrance to Roslyn Place
