= Roslyn Place (street) =

Wood-paved street in Pittsburgh, Pennsylvania

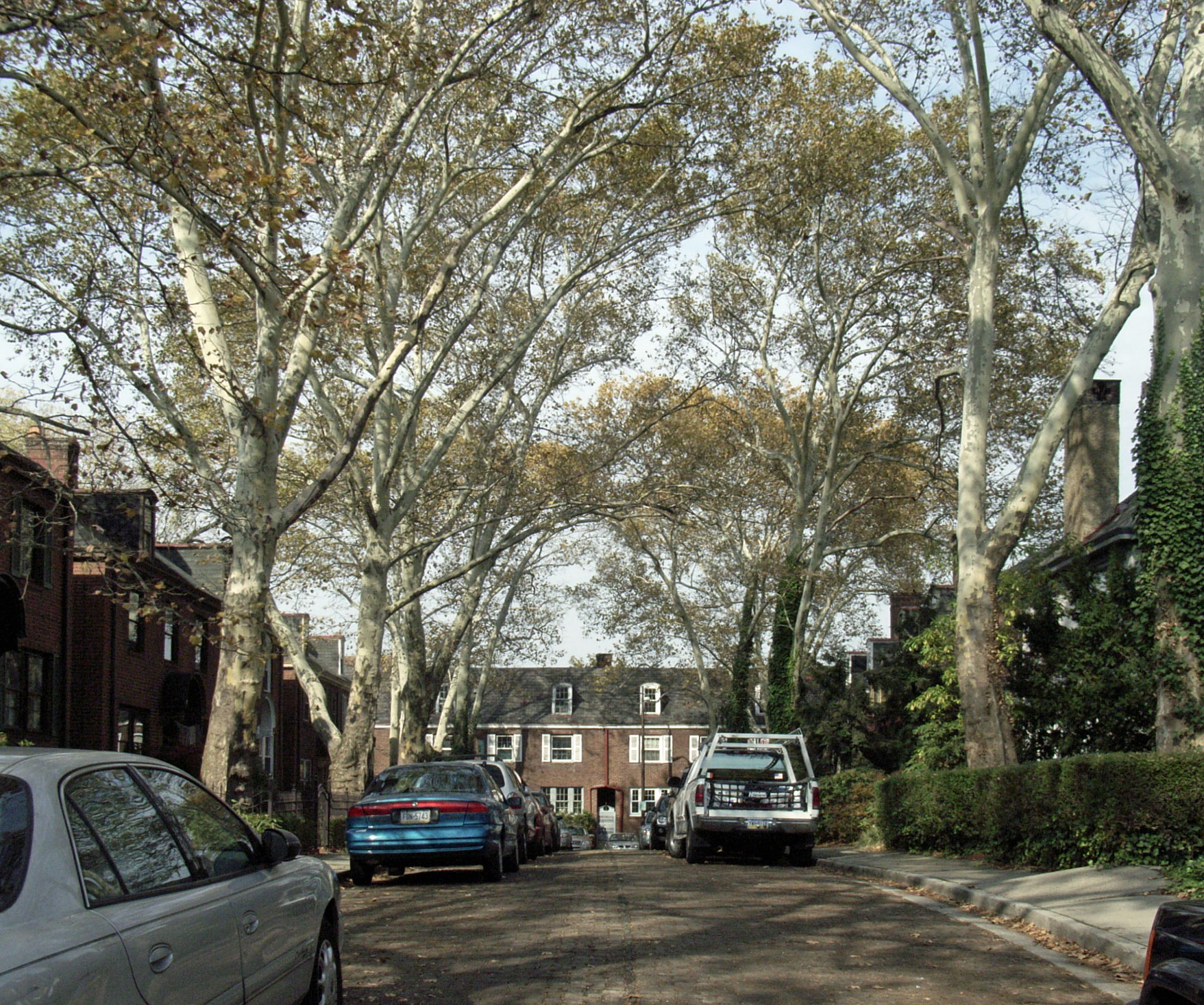
- Photo of the houses surrounding the street

- Location within Pittsburgh
- 40°27′12.74″N 79°56′9.94″W
- Location: Roslyn Place (Shadyside), Pittsburgh, Pennsylvania, USA

History
- Built: 1914

Site notes
- Architect: Thomas Rodd
- Governing body: City of Pittsburgh

Roslyn Place is a small wooden-paved cul-de-sac located in the Shadyside neighborhood of Pittsburgh, Pennsylvania. The street was built in 1914 in the Nicolson Pavement style and is home to the historic Roslyn Place district.

== History ==
The land on which the current Roslyn Place sits was owned by a multitude of different owners, including J.W. Friday, until the late 1800s. By 1904 English immigrant Thomas Rodd bought the area, and the land adjacent to the southwest. Thomas Rodd emigrated from London at the age of 5, and following a short career as a naval officer during the American Civil War, he joined the Pennsylvania Railroad Company. After becoming chief engineer of all lines west of Pittsburgh for the railroad company, he and his family moved to Pittsburgh in 1889. The Rodd family quickly became members of Pittsburgh's social elite joining the Pittsburgh Club, the Duquesne Club, the Allegheny County Club, the Pittsburgh Golf Club, the University Club of Pittsburgh, the Metropolitan Club of New York, and the Chicago Club. Rodd was also responsible for the designing and constructing of many buildings in western Pennsylvania and the Midwest. He also designed and funded the construction of the Roslyn Place district and the street. Construction began in 1914 when the City Council passed ordinance No. 181, which approved of the plans for creation of Roslyn Place. The street was made in the Nicolson Pavement style, which is a form of wooden block pavement. Oak blocks were used for construction of the street, resulting in around 26,000 blocks in total. The construction finished later in 1914, and the street remained in that condition for decades, only undergoing minor restorations and repairs. By the 1980s though, the street had significantly deteriorated. The city opted to undergo a significant restoration project in 1985, in which extensive repairs were made. Since then, there have only been minor repairs using surplus materials from the 1985 project. The street was nominated in January 2016 to become a City Historic Landmark by Preservation Pittsburgh. Roslyn Place is said to be the “last known” wooden street in the United States.

== Architecture ==
Roslyn Place is one of the few examples of Nicolson Pavement left in the United States. Nicolson Pavement is a street paving technique that involves creosote-soaked wooden blocks laid down, and was patented by Samuel Nicolson in 1859. The paving of wooden streets was accomplished with four different approaches, and they are each tailored to particular uses for the streets. The advantages of using wooden streets can be seen when they are compared to cobblestone and Belgian block. Cobblestones had rounded edges which made it difficult for horses to gain traction, and although Belgian blocks were slightly preferable, their rounded edges also made it tough for wheels to travel over. Nicolson Pavement was not rounded, but flat, which made it easier for pedestrians, wagon wheels, and horses. Other benefits of Nicolson Pavement were the lower costs, the reduction of noise-level, the more humane surface for horses, and there was evidence that wherever Nicolson Pavement was laid, the rents of the buildings nearby rose by more than a third. Roslyn Place is the last remaining example of Nicolson Pavement in Pittsburgh, and is the only street in the United States entirely paved in accordance with the Nicolson paving techniques. Roslyn Place also featured in notable urban designer Allan Jacobs' book Great Streets where it is compared to the likes of the Champs-Élysées in Paris and Pennsylvania Avenue in Washington, D.C.

== Gallery ==
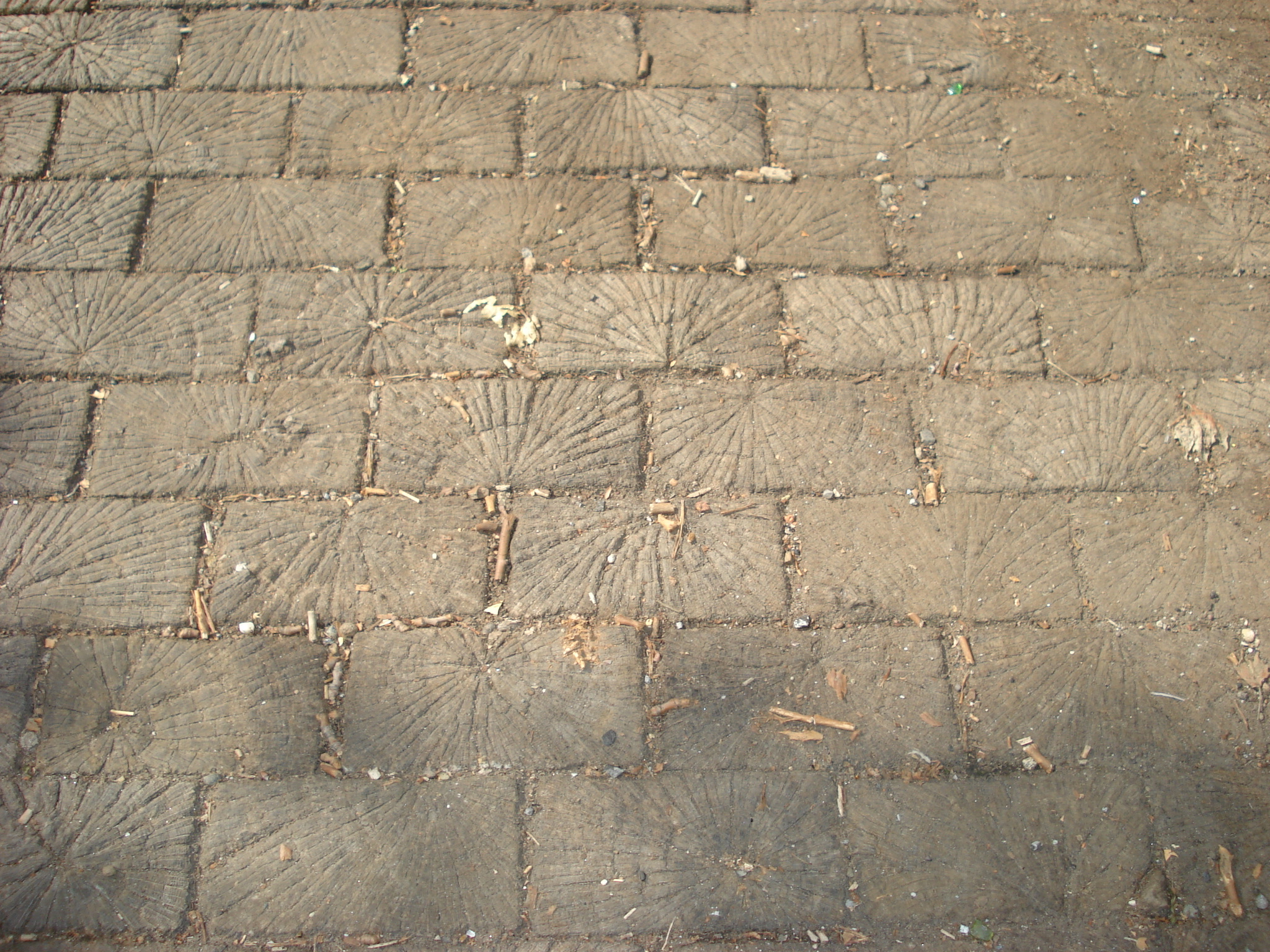
Close-up of the wooden blocks

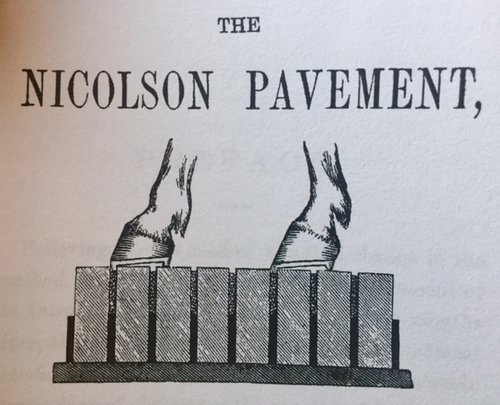
Photo depicting a horse walking on Nicolson Pavement
