= Cranberry Township, Pennsylvania =

Cranberry Township is the name of some places in the U.S. state of Pennsylvania:

- Cranberry Township, Butler County, Pennsylvania
- Cranberry Township, Venango County, Pennsylvania
