= Healthy Ride =

Bike-sharing system in Pittsburgh, Pennsylvania, United States

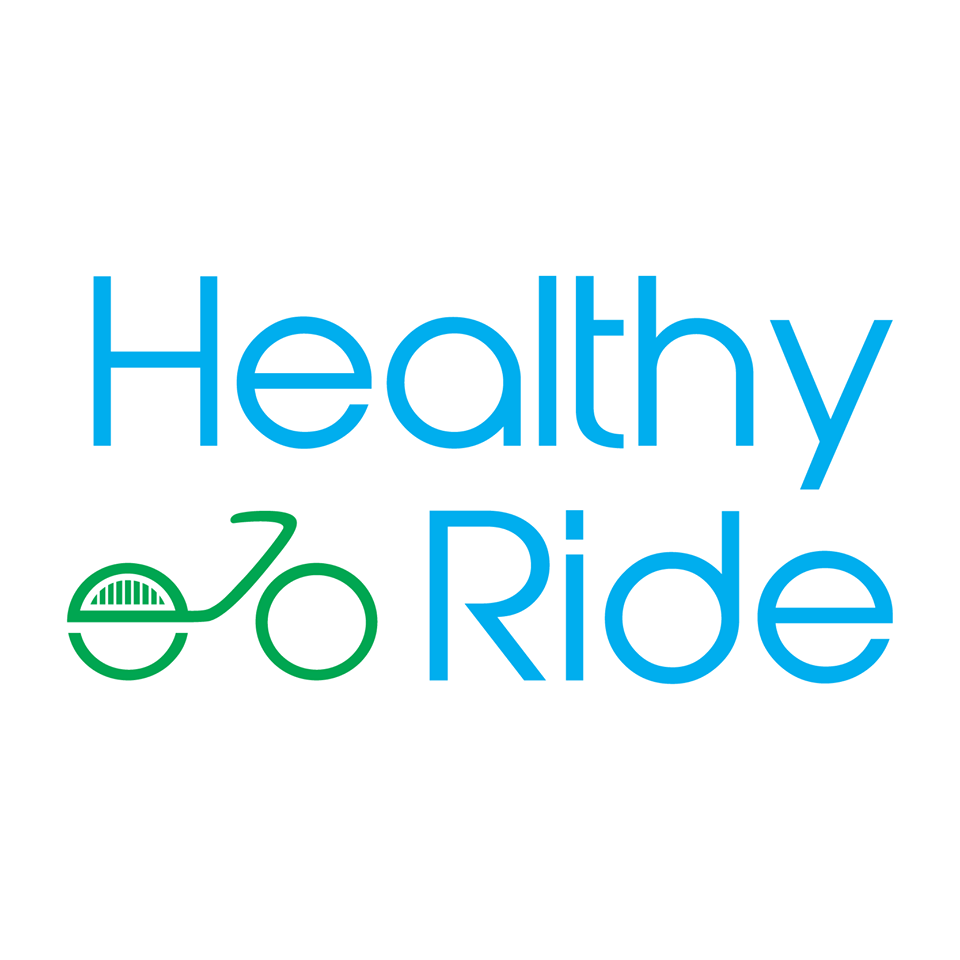

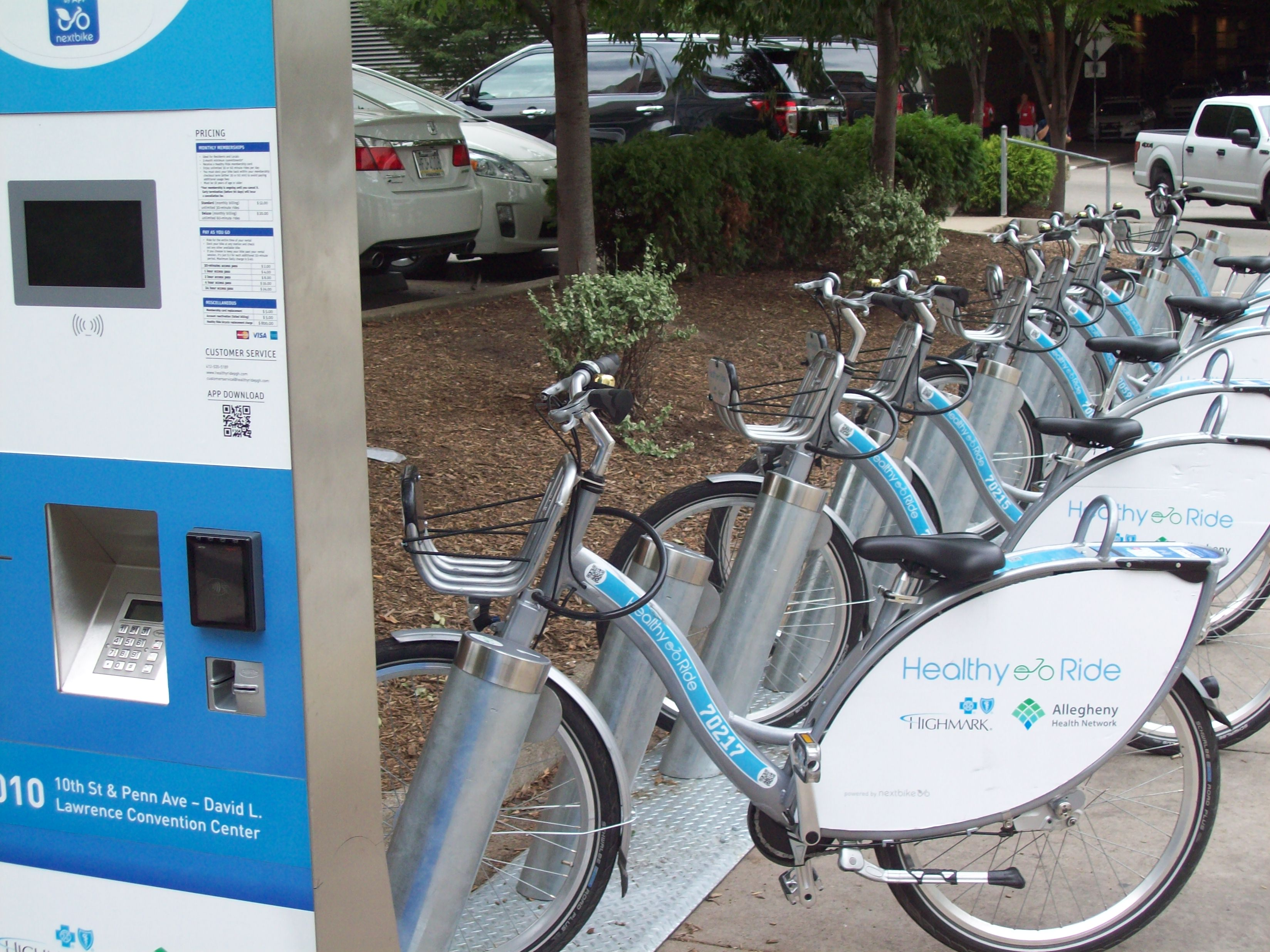
- Healthy Ride station

Overview
- Owner: Pittsburgh Bike Share
- Locale: Pittsburgh, PA
- Transit type: Bicycle-sharing system
- Number of stations: 110
- Annual ridership: 114,000 (2019)
- Website: healthyridepgh.com

Operation
- Began operation: May 31, 2015; 11 years ago
- Operator(s): Pittsburgh Bike Share
- Number of vehicles: 650

Healthy Ride is a public bicycle sharing system that serves parts of Pittsburgh. Operations started on May 31, 2015, with 50 stations and 500 bikes. The system is owned and operated by Pittsburgh Bike Share, a Pittsburgh-based 501c3, with bikes provided by Nextbike.

== History ==
Pittsburgh Bike Share was founded in December 2012 and incubated by Bike Pittsburgh. The organization was created due to mounting interest in implementing a municipal bike share system in Pittsburgh from a collection of local leaders: planners at the City of Pittsburgh, business leaders at Walnut Capital, and bicycle/pedestrian advocates at Bike Pittsburgh.

In 2013 Bike Pittsburgh raised significant capital from local foundations–including Heinz Endowments, Buhl Foundation, Henry L. Hillman Foundation, Richard King Mellon Foundation, and other anonymous donors–to cover planning and capital costs and match a $1.6 million Congestion Mitigation and Air Quality improvement (CMAQ) grant from the Federal Highway Administration. This successful fundraising campaign launched the bike share project. Bike Pittsburgh, working alongside leaders at the Department of City Planning, hired Alta Planning + Design to develop a business plan for the program. Alta Planning + Design, in partnership with the City of Pittsburgh Department of City Planning, conducted a thorough community outreach and planning operation and completed the business plan in 2013.

In 2014, the City advertised a bid for bike share procurement and system installation. The bid was awarded to S.E.T., an Ohio-based general contractor, partnering with Nextbike, a German company with over 20,000 bicycles deployed in bike-share systems worldwide, to provide the system equipment, including GPS enabled bicycles, solar powered kiosks and docking stations, and software to operate the system. As mandated by Pennsylvania Department of Transportation and the CMAQ grant requirement, the City of Pittsburgh contracted with a federally certified project management team, CDR Maguire, to manage the implementation.

Operations started on May 31, 2015, with 50 stations and 500 bikes. As of April 2019, Healthy Ride had 650 bicycles. As of November, 2018, the system had expanded to over 100 stations.

In July 2019, the Healthy Bike announced that it will be adding several e-bikes to its fleet. In August 2019, The University of Pittsburgh partnered with the Healthy Bike to provide free 30-minute rides to all first-year undergraduate students and resident assistants.

== Pricing ==
Healthy Ride offers three plans:

- Deluxe, a monthly membership for $20. It allows unlimited trips up to one hour (the user is charged $2 per 30 minutes after the first hour of each rental).
- Standard, a monthly membership for $12. It allows unlimited trips up to 30 minutes (the user is charged $2 per 30 minutes after the first 30 minutes of each rental).
- Pay As You Go, no membership fee, each trip is charged $2 per half-hour. This plan can be purchased at any Healthy Ride station.

== See also ==
- List of bicycle sharing systems
