= Walnut Street (Pittsburgh) =

Street in Pittsburgh, Pennsylvania

Coordinates: 40.453516°N 79.927094°W

- Stores on Walnut Street.
- Interactive map of Walnut Street
- Location: Pittsburgh, Pennsylvania, United States
- West end: Aiken Street in Oakland
- East end: Denniston Street in East Liberty

Walnut Street is located in the Shadyside neighborhood of Pittsburgh, Pennsylvania. It runs southwest-northeast, bounded on the west by South Aiken Avenue and on the east by Denniston Street. Walnut Street is best known for its upscale shopping, fine dining, and private boutiques. Some stores include Apple, Apricot Lane Boutique, Blick Art Materials, J.Jill, lululemon, Moda, Patagonia, and Williams Sonoma.

Some popular local restaurants include Cappy's, Mario's, Shady Grove, William Penn Tavern, Pamela's Diner and La Feria.

== Stores and restaurants ==
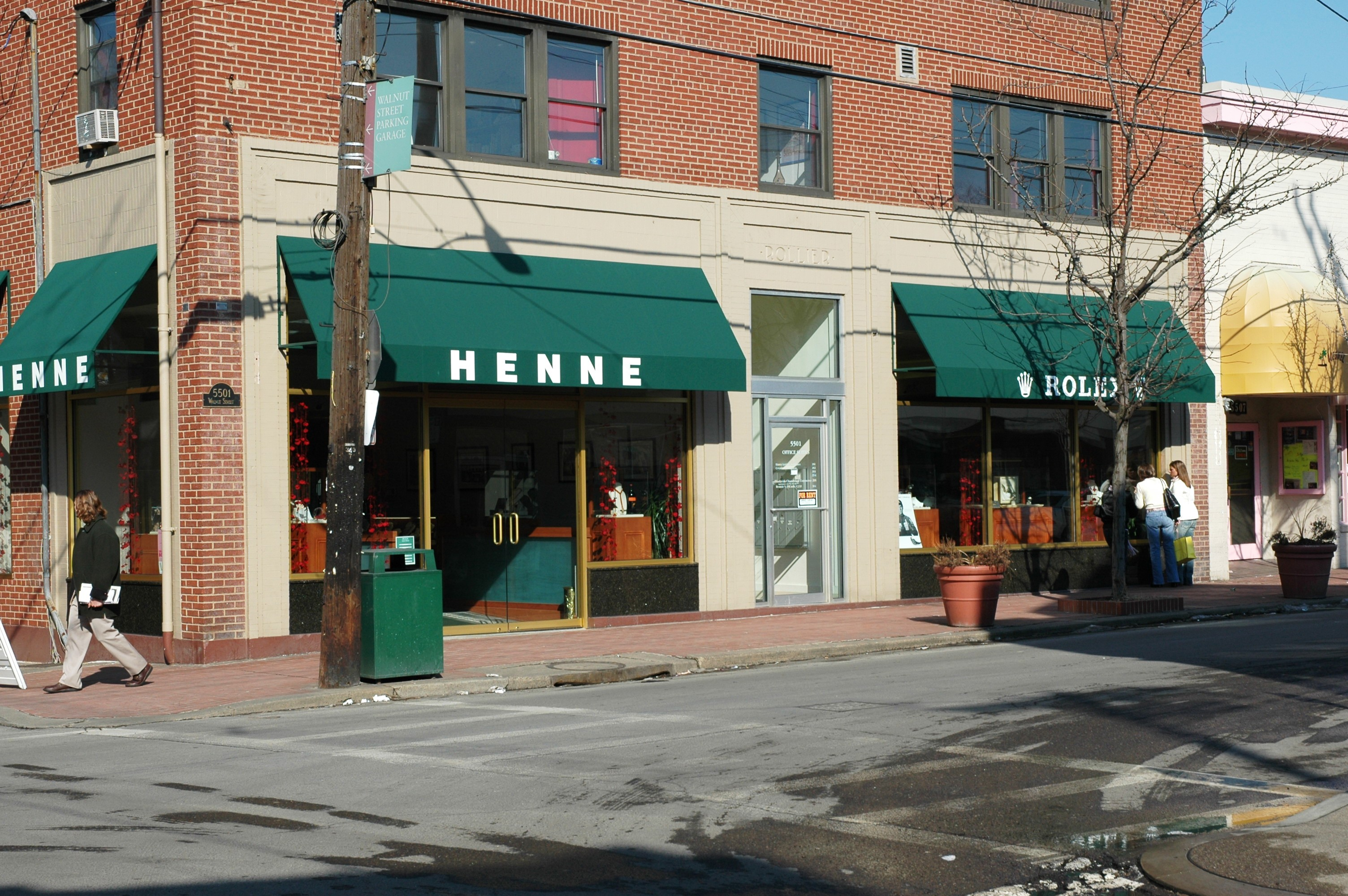
Henne Jewelers storefront.

Henne Jewelers, one of Pittsburgh's older jewelry stores, is also located on Walnut Street. The store was founded in 1887.

Kawaii-Gifts is a store that sells Pittsburgh's largest stock of Japanese imports, including brands like San-X and Uglydolls.

La Feria is a Peruvian restaurant and shop that sells clothes and folk art. It opened in 1993.

== Festivals ==
"The Jam on Walnut" is a summer concert series that features local and regional music concerts. The concerts are held on the last Saturday of each summer month, on the corner of Bellefonte and Walnut Street. Proceeds from beer sales go to cystic fibrosis.

The area also holds an annual arts festival in August known as the "Art Festival on Walnut Street". The festival includes a juried art show. Nearby, Ellsworth Avenue also holds an annual arts festival in the same month, and the two festivals have an unofficial rivalry.

== Gallery ==
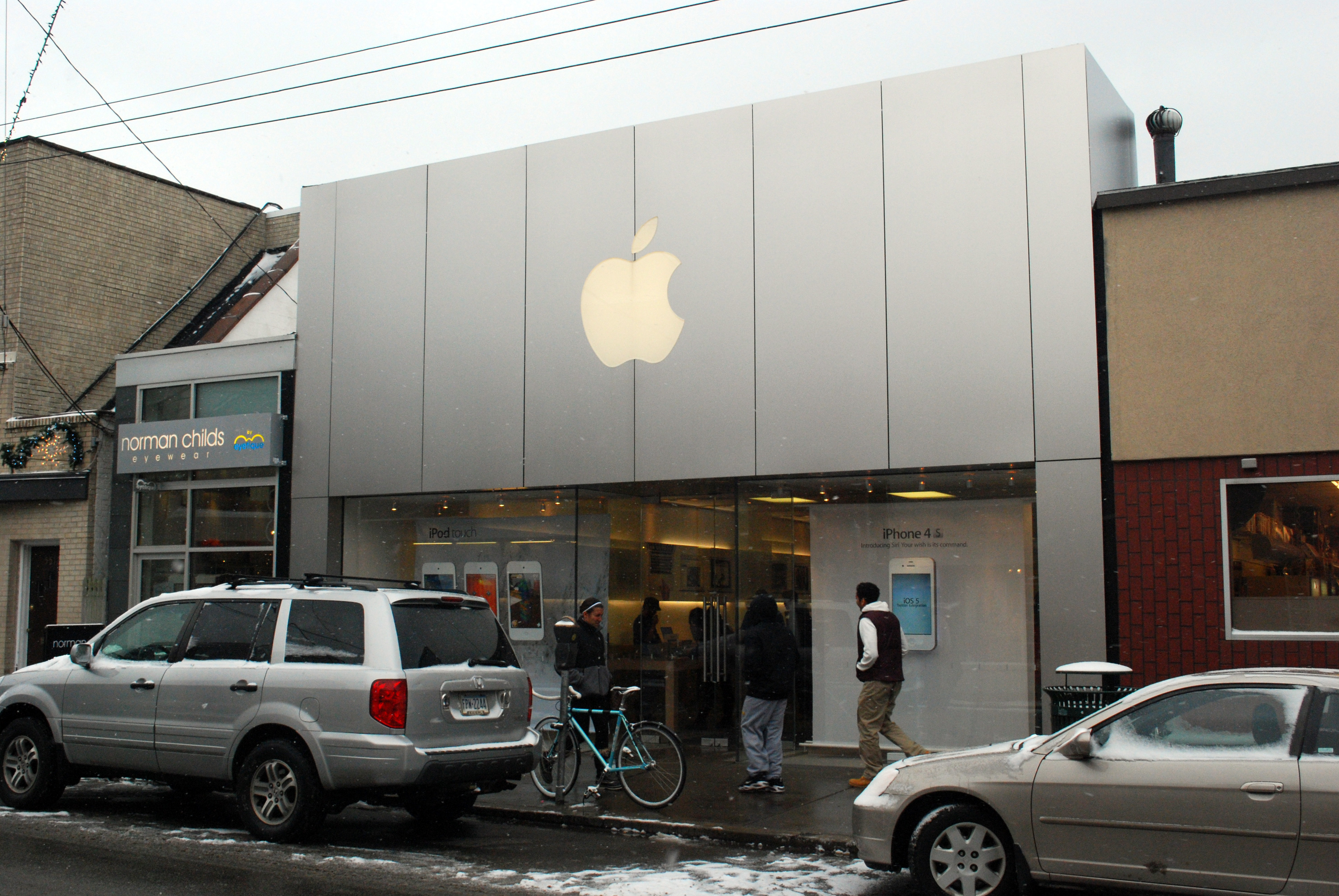
Apple store

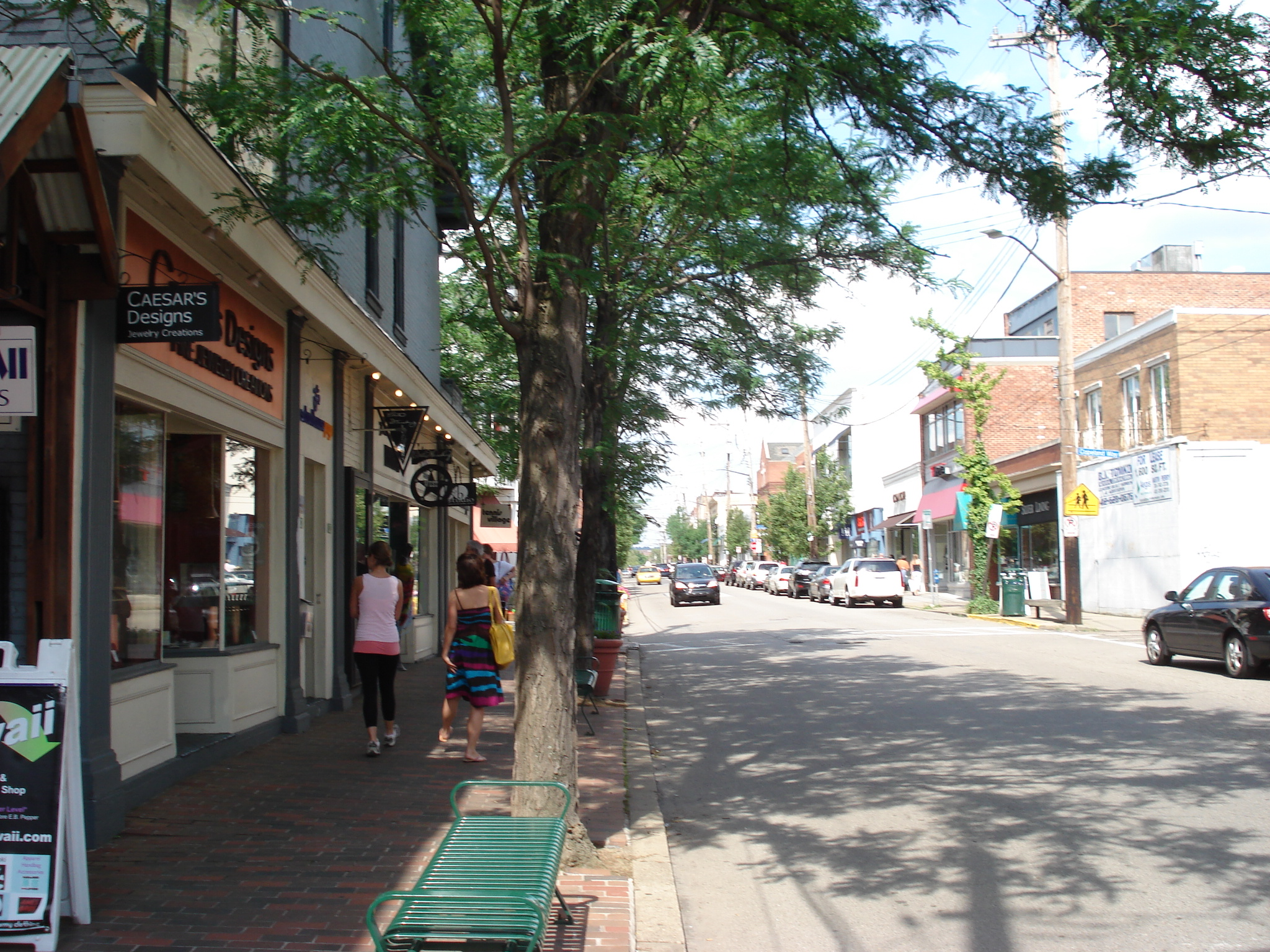

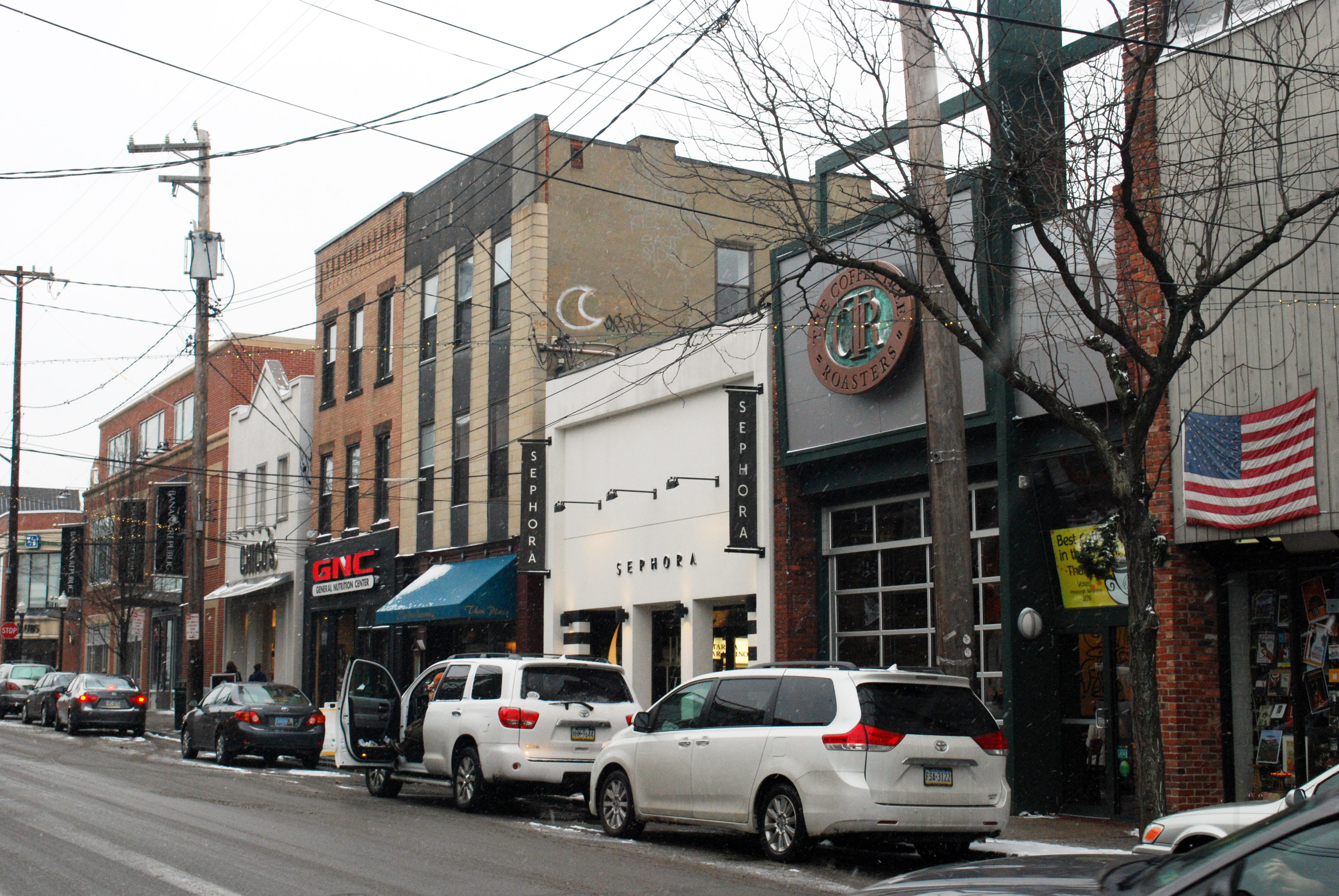

== See also ==
- Ellsworth Avenue
