= Ellsworth Avenue =

Street in the Shadyside district of Pittsburgh

Coordinates: 40.453458°N 79.935184°W

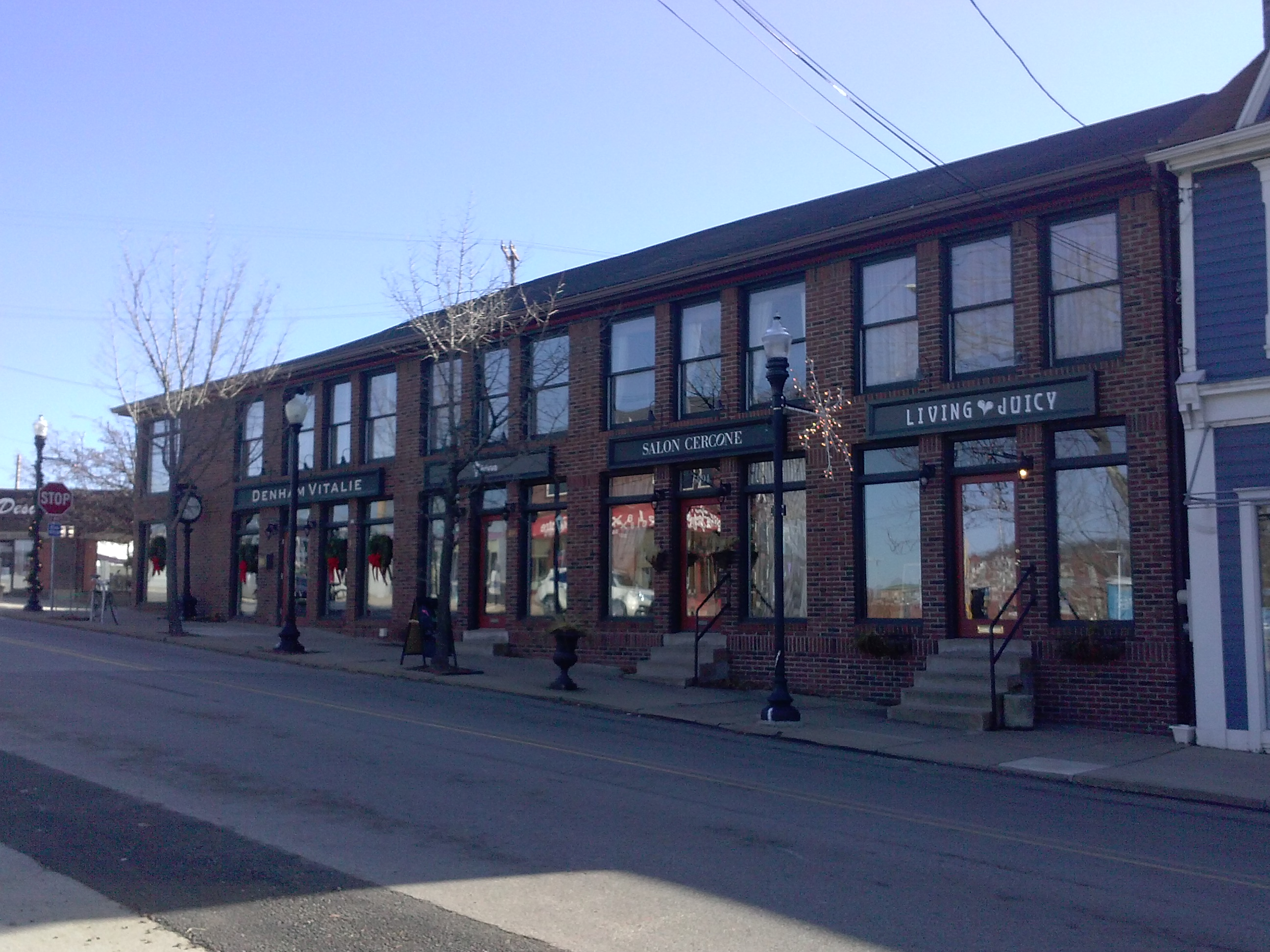
- Shops on Ellsworth Avenue.
- Interactive map of Ellsworth Avenue
- Location: Pittsburgh, Pennsylvania, United States
- West end: Neville Street
- East end: Shady Avenue

Ellsworth Avenue is located in the Shadyside neighborhood of Pittsburgh, Pennsylvania. It is mostly a commercial street that has locally owned businesses, galleries, restaurants, and bars. It runs southwest-northeast, parallel to Walnut Street, another commercial street, and is bounded by Shady Avenue to the east and South Neville Street to the west. Ellsworth Avenue is one of Shadyside's three business districts, along with South Highland Avenue and Walnut Street.

Several Pittsburgh Historic Landmarks line Ellsworth Avenue. At the corner of Neville and Ellsworth is the Church of the Ascension, an episcopalian church that was named a landmark in 1971. Colonial Place is a mansion designed by George S. Orth that became a landmark in 1898. Roslyn Place (a wood-paved street) and Ellsworth Terrace are also landmarks located here.

== History ==
The street was named for Colonel Elmer Ellsworth, the first Union officer killed in the Civil War.

A mural was painted on a west-facing wall of 5883 Ellsworth Ave to commemorate Margo Lovelace’s contribution to the arts in the region.

== Pedestrian bridge ==
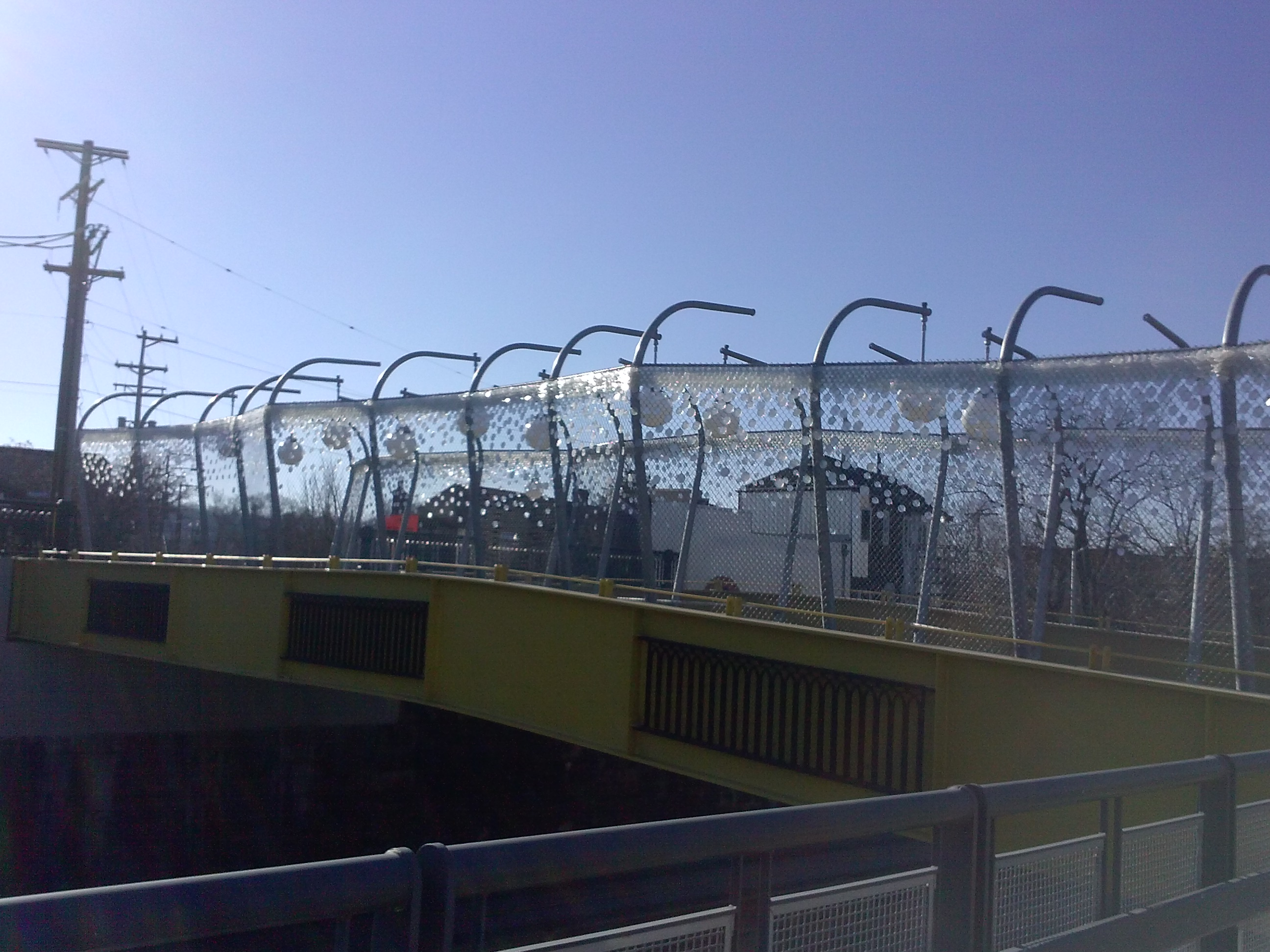
Shadyside pedestrian bridge connecting Eastside developments to Ellsworth Avenue.

In 2008, the Urban Redevelopment Authority approved a design by Sheila King for a footbridge to connect businesses in the Eastside of Shadyside with Ellsworth Avenue and Spahr Street.

The bridge connects Ellsworth Avenue with several businesses in the Eastside, including MCN Salon, Whole Foods Market, Pure Barre, Chipotle Mexican Grill, and Fine Wine & Good Spirits.

== Martin Luther King Jr. mural ==
There is a 100-foot-long mural dedicated to Martin Luther King Jr. at the corner of Ellsworth Avenue, near the busway stop in East Liberty, that was created in the summer of 2007. The mural begins at Ellsworth, goes along Shady Avenue, and ends at Penn Avenue. The idea for the mural started with local Pittsburgh artist Kyle Holbrook.

The mural panels were funded by local foundations including The Heinz Endowments, Grable Foundation, Pittsburgh Foundation, Laurel Foundation, August Wilson Center for African American Culture, Multicultural Arts Initiative and National City Bank.

== Gallery ==
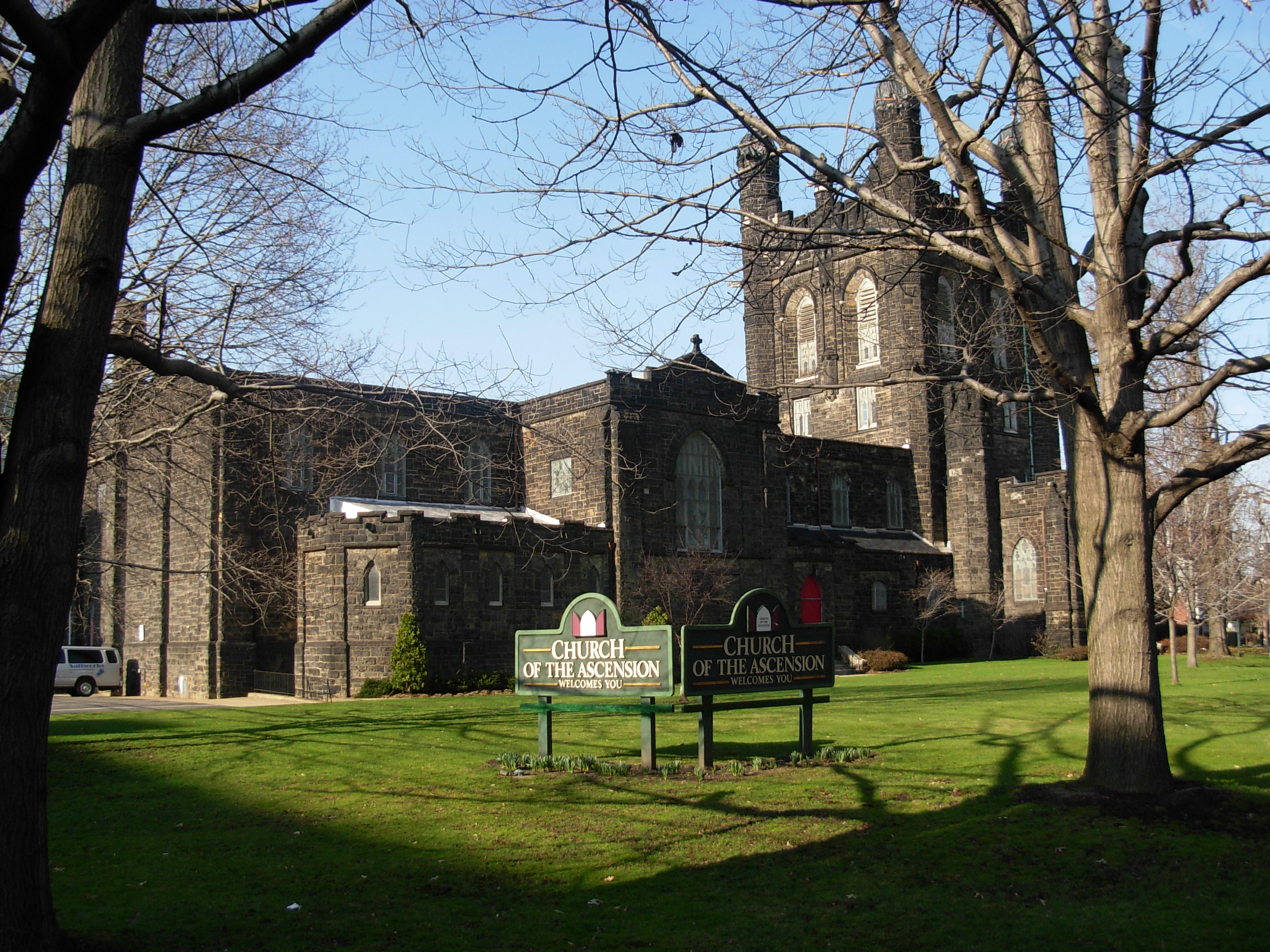
Church of the Ascension

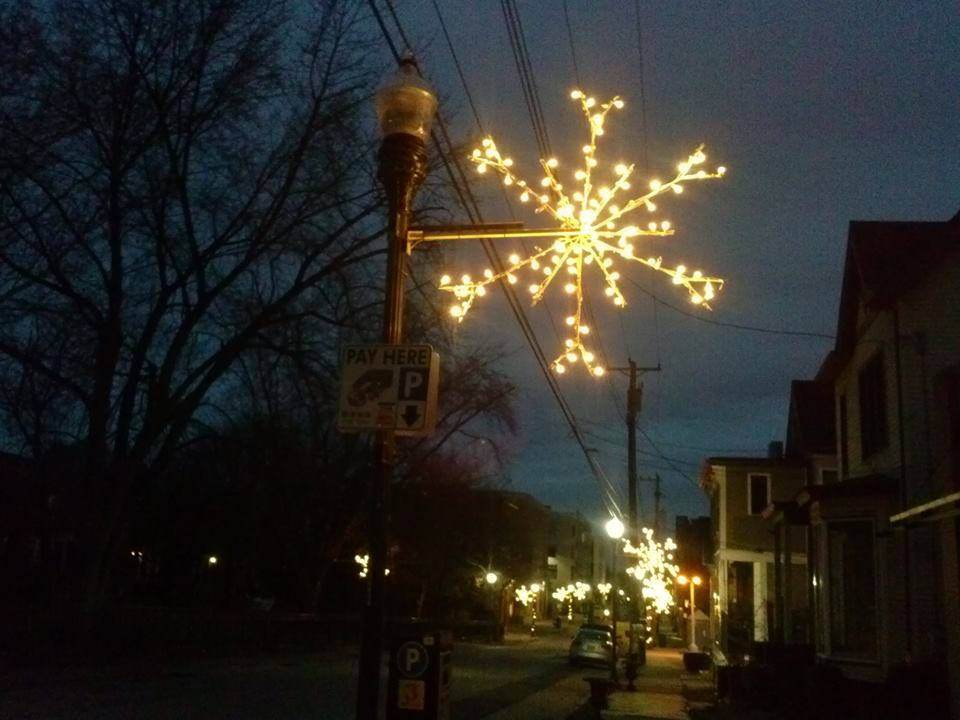
Snowflake lights on Ellsworth

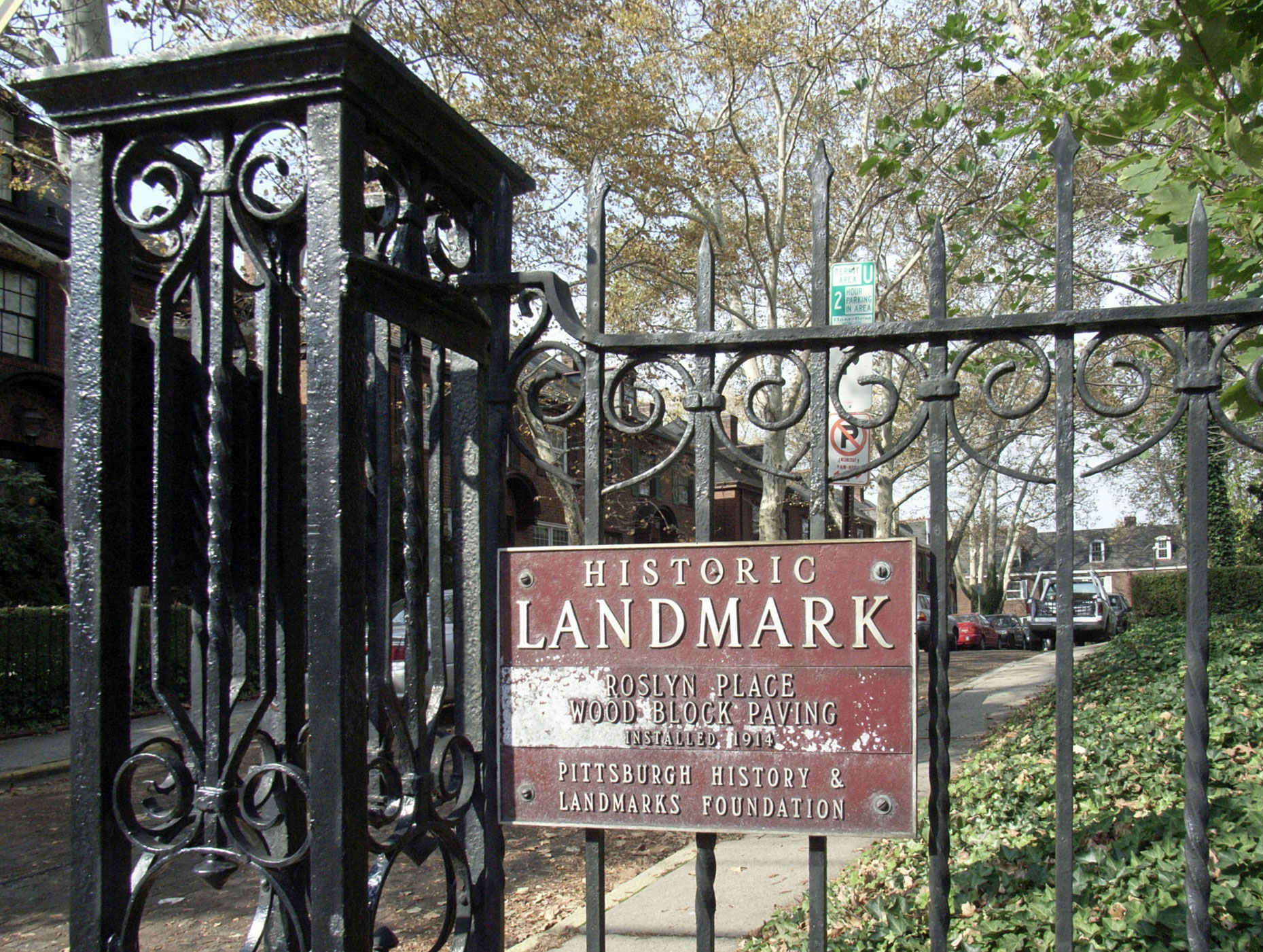
Roslyn Place

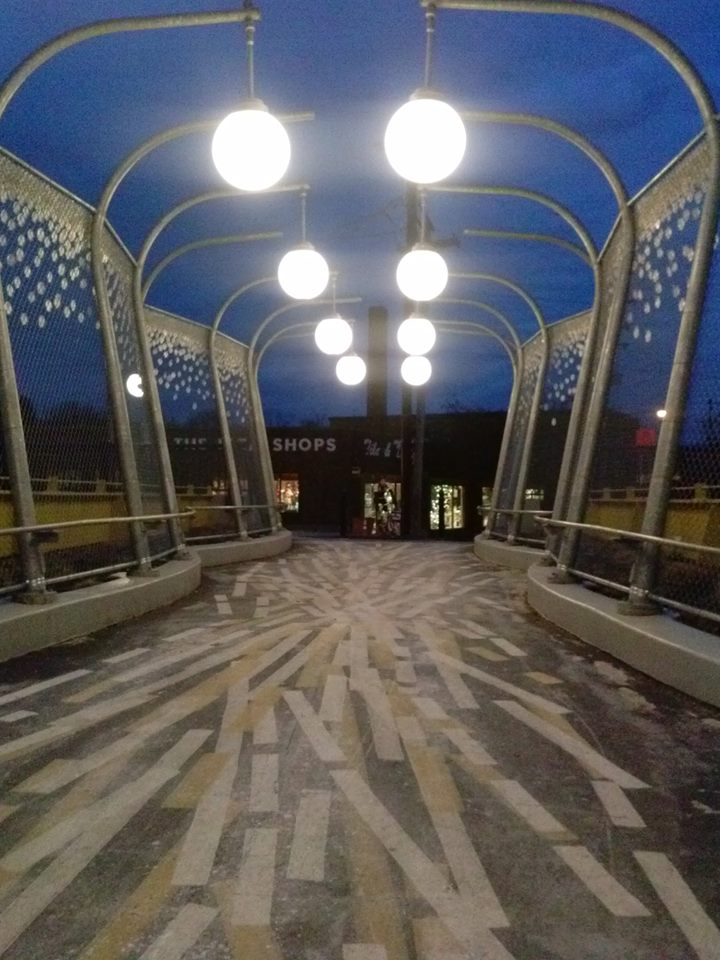
Footbridge
