= The Mansion at Maple Heights =

Historical Jacobean mansion in Pennsylvania, U.S.

The Mansion at Maple Heights is a historical Jacobean mansion in Pittsburgh, Pennsylvania, that has been renovated and was, from 2009 to 2018, used as a bed and breakfast.

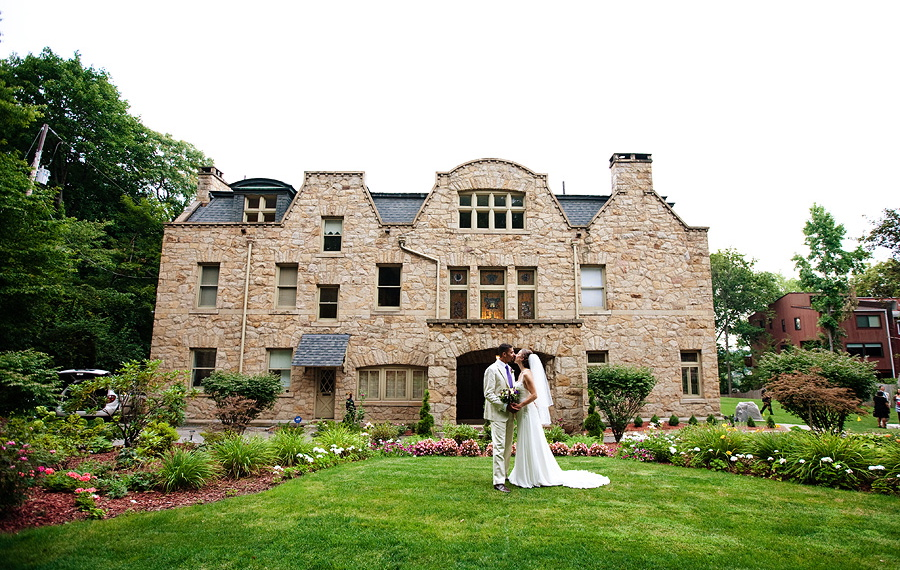
The Mansion, 2010

== History ==
The house was built in 1903 by Thiebold Berger, a prominent business man in the printing press industry. He built the home as a wedding gift for his daughter and new son-in-law. Originally, the house was red brick, but the daughter did not like it, so Berger had sandstone put around the exterior of the home. It was one of four mansions on Maple Heights Road, which used to be recognized a part of 5th Avenue in Shadyside, a prominent, affluent neighborhood in Pittsburgh.
