= Church of the Ascension (Pittsburgh) =

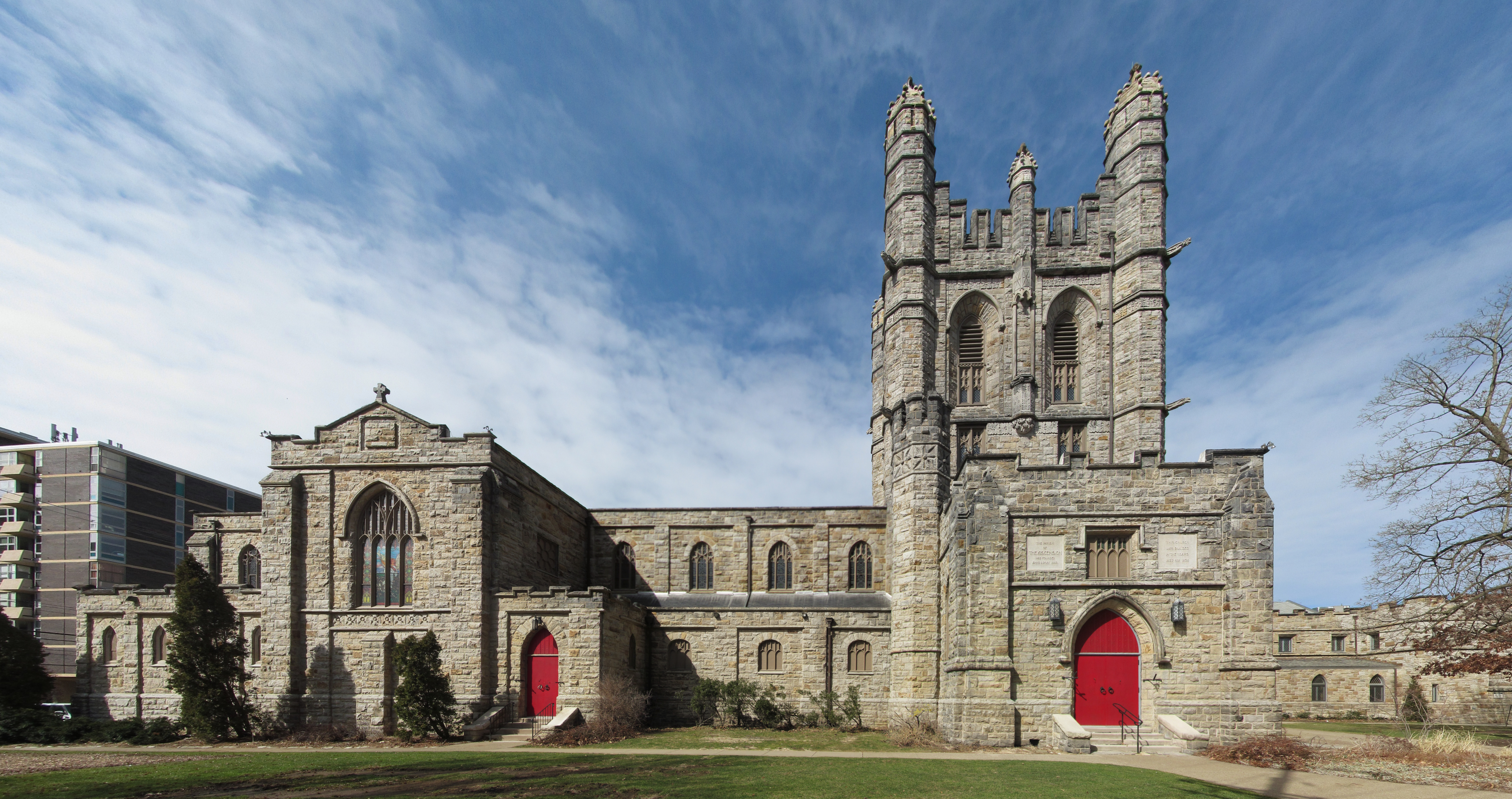
- Church of the Ascension
- Location: Pittsburgh, Pennsylvania
- Country: United States
- Denomination: Anglican Church in North America
- Website: www.ascensionpittsburgh.org

History
- Founded: 1889
- Dedicated: December 30, 1898

Administration
- Diocese: Pittsburgh

Clergy
- Rector: The Rev. Peter Coelho
- 40°26′55.48″N 79°56′50.34″W
- Location: Ellsworth Avenue and Neville Street (Shadyside), Pittsburgh, Pennsylvania, USA

History
- Built: 1898

Site notes
- Architect: William Halsey Wood

Pittsburgh Landmark – PHLF
- Designated: 1971

The Church of the Ascension is an Anglican church located at Ellsworth Avenue and Neville Street in the Shadyside neighborhood of Pittsburgh, Pennsylvania.

Completed in 1898, the new church building was dedicated on December 31 of that year, and was added to the List of Pittsburgh History and Landmarks Foundation Historic Landmarks in 1971.

== History and features ==
Designed by architect William Halsey Wood, the cornerstone for the Church of the Ascension was laid in Pittsburgh on Sunday, July 4, 1897. The Rev. R. W. Grange, rector, supervised the proceedings; the Rev. L. P. Cole, archdeacon of the diocese, delivered the ceremonial address. Construction of the main church building was subsequently completed in 1898.

Like nearly all of the Episcopal churches of the area that operated during the first half of the 20th century, this church boasted a fine professional choir of men and boys, which became a hallmark of Sunday services. The music-heavy ritual of Morning Prayer from the 1928 Book of Common Prayer was performed three Sundays out of four with the fourth Sunday being devoted to the celebration of Holy Communion. The choir's choral accomplishments peaked twice under the direction of Herbert C. Peabody in the 1930s and Robert Hamilton Cato in the 1940s.

On May 19, 1898, the Knights Templar, of Pittsburgh and Allegheny, attended Ascension Day services at the church. The church's boys choir performed the music for this special service.

The new church building was then officially dedicated on December 30, 1898, during what was described by Pittsburgh-area newspapers as "an elaborate program," which was led by the Rev. Dr. R. W. Grange, rector, and Bishop Cortlandt Whitehead, D.D. The initial music program performed by the church's choirs during the next morning's opening services included:

- Processional Hymn 483: "Christ Is Made the Sure Foundation" (Frederic Archer);
- Festival Responses: Pallis, Venite, Turle, in A;
- Psalms: 84, 122, 134, in E (Goss);
- Te Deum, Jubilate, Kyrie, Nicene creed, Sanctus and Gloria, in E (Horatio Parker);
- Introit: "O Sing to God", Miss Vandergrift, soprano solo (Charles Gounod).

The Rt. Rev. Bishop then delivered the sermon, which was followed by the choir's performance of the hymn, "O 'Twas a Joyful Sound to Hear," the offertory portion of the service, the choir's performance of Archer's festival anthem, "The Glorious Majesty of the Lord," A. S. Sullivan's "Draw Nigh" as the communion hymn, and Felix Mendelssohn's "Hark! The Herald Angels Sing" as the recessional music.

=== Present day ===
The church is currently a member of the Anglican Diocese of Pittsburgh, in the Anglican Church in North America.
