= Winchester Thurston School =

Prep school in Pittsburgh, Pennsylvania, US

Location
- 555 Morewood Avenue; Pittsburgh, Pennsylvania 15213; United States; 40.451497341373°N 79.94251152399313°W

Information
- Type: Independent, preparatory school
- Motto: Latin: Candide Modo Fortiter Re (Gentle in manner, strong in deed)
- Religious affiliation: Nonsectarian
- Established: 1887; 139 years ago
- Founder: Alice M. Thurston
- CEEB code: 393970
- NCES School ID: A9106118
- Head of school: Scott D. Fech
- Faculty: 73 (on an FTE basis)
- Grades: JPK–12
- Gender: Coeducational
- Enrollment: 656 (2021-2022)
- Student to teacher ratio: 8.6:1
- Hours in school day: 6.8
- Campus size: 7 acres (2.8 ha)
- Campus type: Large suburb
- Colors: Purple, Black, and Yellow
- Athletics conference: WPIAL
- Nickname: Bears
- Accreditation: NAIS, PAIS
- Newspaper: Voices
- Yearbook: Thistledown
- Endowment: $18.83 million
- Annual tuition: $34,250 11-12 $33,250 9-10 $29,750 6-8 $25,500 2-5 $24,250 1 $20,500 K $18,000 PK
- Revenue: $21.92 million
- Website: www.winchesterthurston.org

Winchester Thurston School is an independent, coeducational preparatory school located in the Shadyside neighborhood of Pittsburgh, Pennsylvania. Established in 1887, Winchester Thurston offers JPK–12 education in Lower, Middle, and Upper School. The school is a member of the Pittsburgh Consortium of Independent Schools.

== History ==
Winchester Thurston has its origins in the founding of the all-girls Thurston Preparatory School by Alice M. Thurston in Shadyside in 1887. The Winchester School was founded separately, also in Shadyside, as a coeducational school in 1902. The two schools merged to produce the all-girls Winchester Thurston School in 1935. The school moved to its current Shadyside campus, formerly the site of Shady Side Academy, in the fall of 1967. The school added its second Lower School campus in Allison Park in 1988; this campus permanently closed in June 2020. Winchester Thurston became co-educational in 1991.

The school has constructed several facilities, including the Main Building in 1963, a science wing in 1987, and a new turf field called Garland Field. The school has three libraries, an art gallery, Mellon Gymnasium, an athletics hall of fame, a solarium, a learning garden, a dance studio, the Hillman Dining Hall, and Lower, Middle, and Upper school science labs, as well as three computer labs.

== Curriculum ==
=== Arts ===
Winchester Thurston has received Gene Kelly Awards and has been nominated for their theater performances.

== Extracurricular activities ==
=== Athletics ===
The interscholastic single-A sports program allows Middle and Upper School students to represent WT on the courts, tracks, and fields of the Pittsburgh area. WT fields athletes in crew, cross country, field hockey, golf, soccer, tennis, basketball, fencing, squash, lacrosse, and track. In 2021, the Boys' Soccer team won the WPIAL and PIAA State Championships and finished 24–0.
