= Sellers House (Pittsburgh, Pennsylvania) =

Historic house in Pennsylvania, United States

- U.S. National Register of Historic Places
- City of Pittsburgh Historic Structure
- Pittsburgh Landmark – PHLF
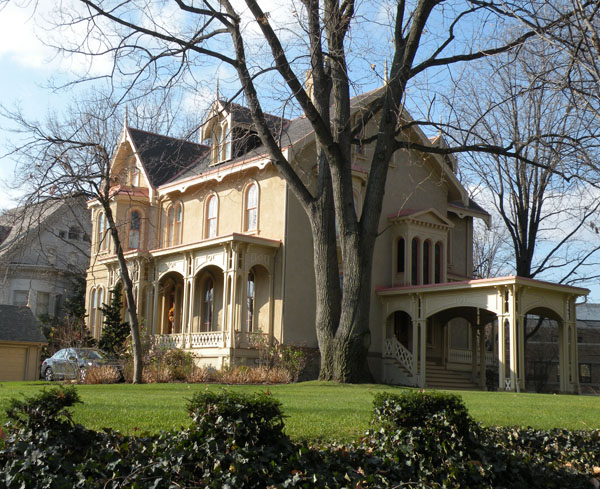

- Location within Pittsburgh Location within Pennsylvania Location within the United States
- Location: 400 Shady Ave., Pittsburgh, Pennsylvania
- Coordinates: 40°27′19″N 79°55′22″W
- Area: 2 acres (0.81 ha)
- Built: 1858
- Architectural style: Second Empire, Italianate, Italian Villa
- NRHP reference No.: 79003142

Significant dates
- Added to NRHP: September 07, 1979
- Designated CPHS: December 31, 1995
- Designated PHLF: 1969

The Sellers House (also known as Calvary Church Rectory) in the Shadyside neighborhood of in Pittsburgh, Pennsylvania is a building from 1858. It was listed on the National Register of Historic Places in 1979. In 1996, it was professionally restored by Samuel Land Company of Pittsburgh, PA.
