= Moreland-Hoffstot House =

Historic house in Pennsylvania, United States

- U.S. National Register of Historic Places
- City of Pittsburgh Historic Structure
- Pittsburgh Landmark – PHLF
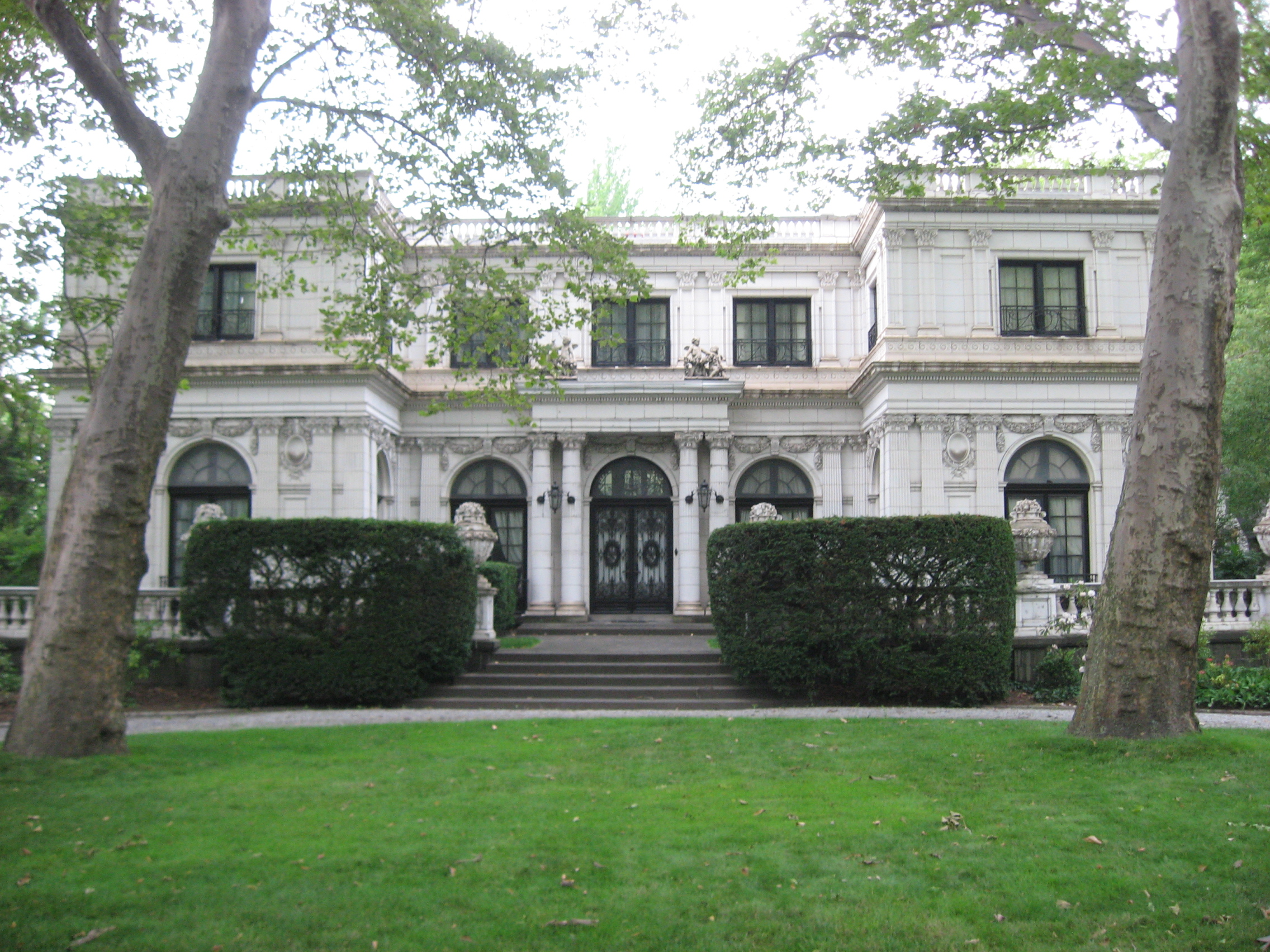

- Location within Pittsburgh Location within Pennsylvania Location within the United States
- Location: 5057 5th Ave., Pittsburgh, Pennsylvania
- Coordinates: 40°26′52″N 79°56′25″W
- Area: 0.5 acres (0.20 ha)
- Built: 1914
- Architect: Irwin, Paul
- Architectural style: Late 19th And 20th Century Revivals, French Renaissance
- NRHP reference No.: 78002337

Significant dates
- Added to NRHP: February 23, 1978
- Designated CPHS: February 22, 1977
- Designated PHLF: 1985

The Moreland-Hoffstot House in the Shadyside neighborhood of Pittsburgh, Pennsylvania is a building from 1914. It was listed on the National Register of Historic Places in 1978.
