= Bindley Hardware Company Building =

- U.S. National Register of Historic Places
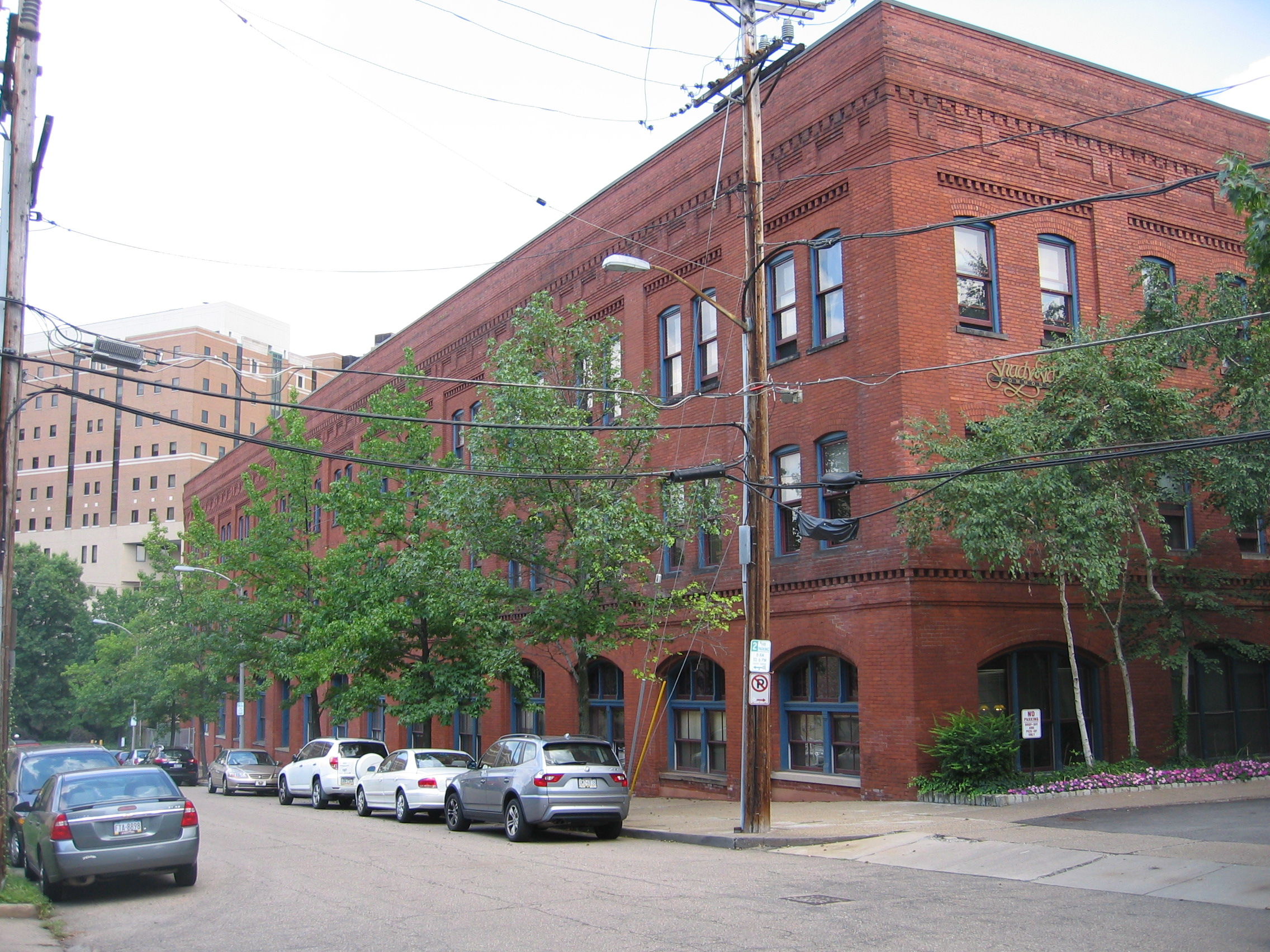

- Location within Pittsburgh Location within Pennsylvania Location within the United States
- Location: 401 Amberson Ave., Pittsburgh, Pennsylvania
- Coordinates: 40°27′13″N 79°56′28″W
- Area: 1.6 acres (0.65 ha)
- Built: 1903
- Architect: Bindley, Albion
- Architectural style: Renaissance, Roman Tuscan
- NRHP reference No.: 85001748
- Added to NRHP: August 08, 1985

The Bindley Hardware Company Building is an historic structure, which is located in the Shadyside neighborhood of Pittsburgh, Pennsylvania. Erected in 1903, along the Pennsylvania Railroad main line and next to the Shadyside Station, the structure was built for John P. Bindley by his brother Albion.

It was listed on the National Register of Historic Places in 1985.

== History and architectural features ==
As president of the Pittsburgh Chamber of Commerce from 1895 to 1902 and of the National Hardware Association, John P. Bindley had tried to organize the hardware industry into a "National Combine" or trust, but failed due to opposition from the government. In response, he established a dominant regional hardware wholesaler in Pittsburgh, which became a major center of hardware manufacturing. The Bindley Hardware Company Building served as its main warehouse.

In September 1909, the firm of Bamberger, Krause & Company leased a portion of the building's second floor.

This building was listed on the National Register of Historic Places in 1985.
