= Henne Jewelers =

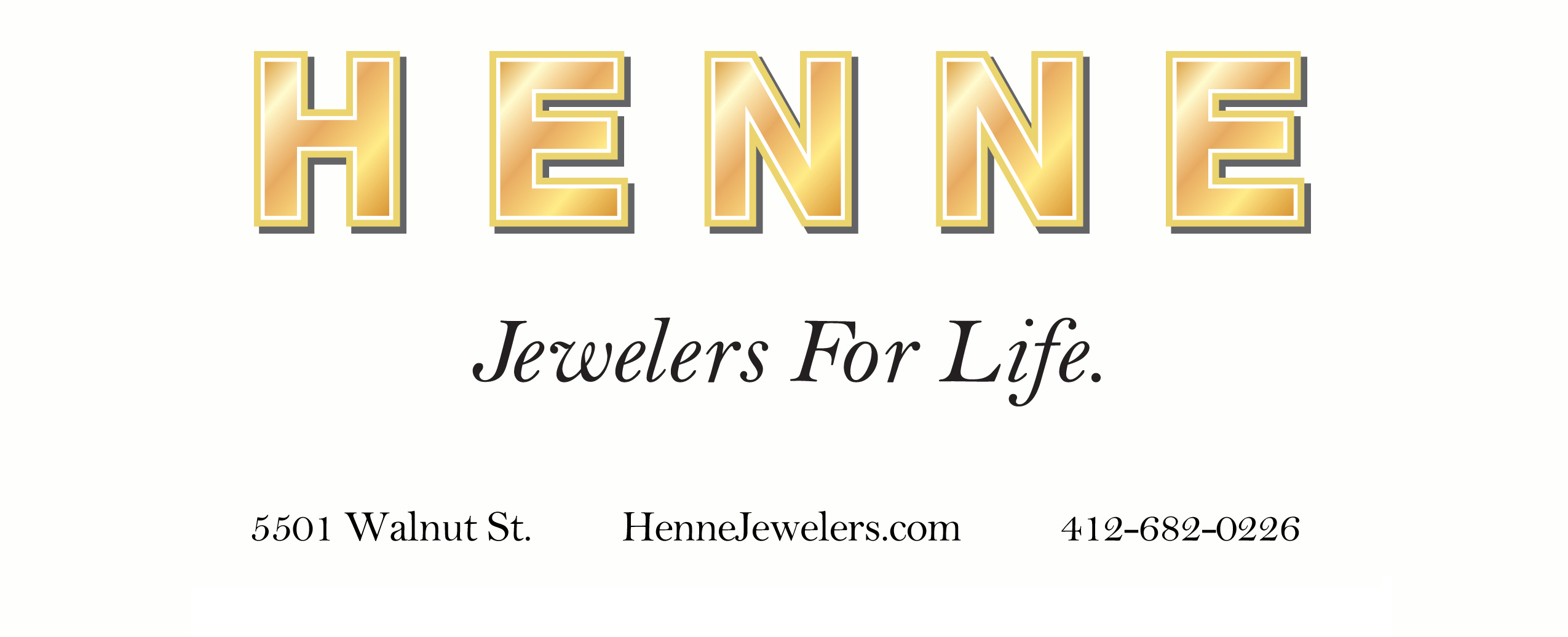
- Type: Privately held company
- Industry: Retail, Jewelry
- Founded: 1887
- Headquarters: Pittsburgh, Pennsylvania, U.S.
- Products: Designer Jewelry, Engagement Rings, Watches, Estate Jewelry, Watch and Jewelry repair
- Owner: John Henne
- Number of employees: 24
- Website: hennejewelers.com

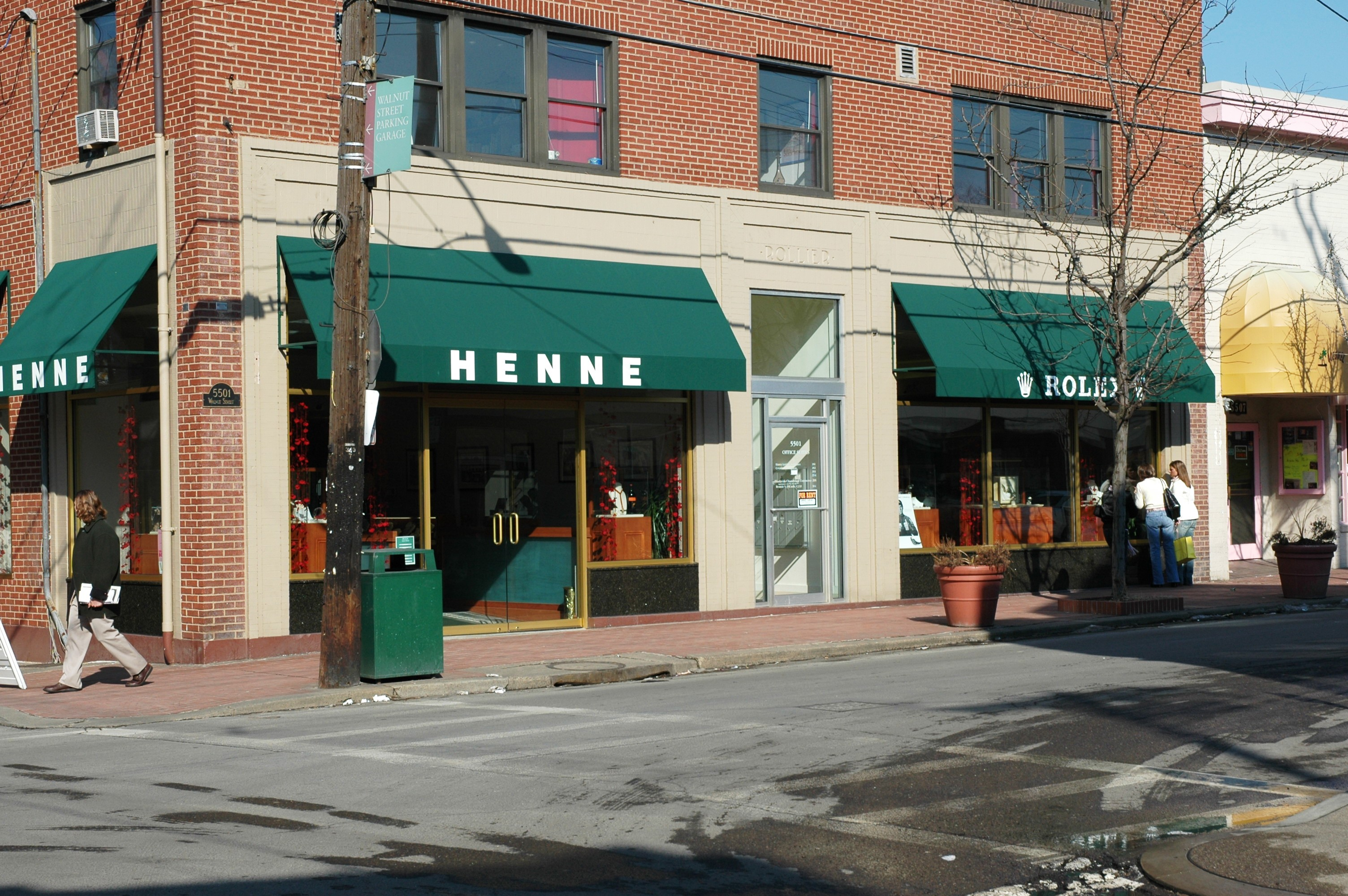
The Henne Jewelers storefront in 2005.

Henne Jewelers is a family owned jewelry store located in the Shadyside (Pittsburgh) neighborhood of Pittsburgh. The store was founded in 1887 by Rudolf Joseph Henne.

It is in its fourth generation of family ownership.

== History ==
In 1887, Rudolf Joseph Henne founded Henne Jewelers in East Liberty as a place where railroad workers could have their watches repaired and serviced. In 1934, Rudolf Gerard Henne inherited the store from his father and managed it through the Great Depression and Second World War until his son Jack took over. In 1978, Jack moved the store from its location in East Liberty to Walnut Street in Shadyside. The 4th generation of Henne's, John, Anne, and Meg moved the store to a larger location on Walnut Street and own and operate the business today.

== In the community ==
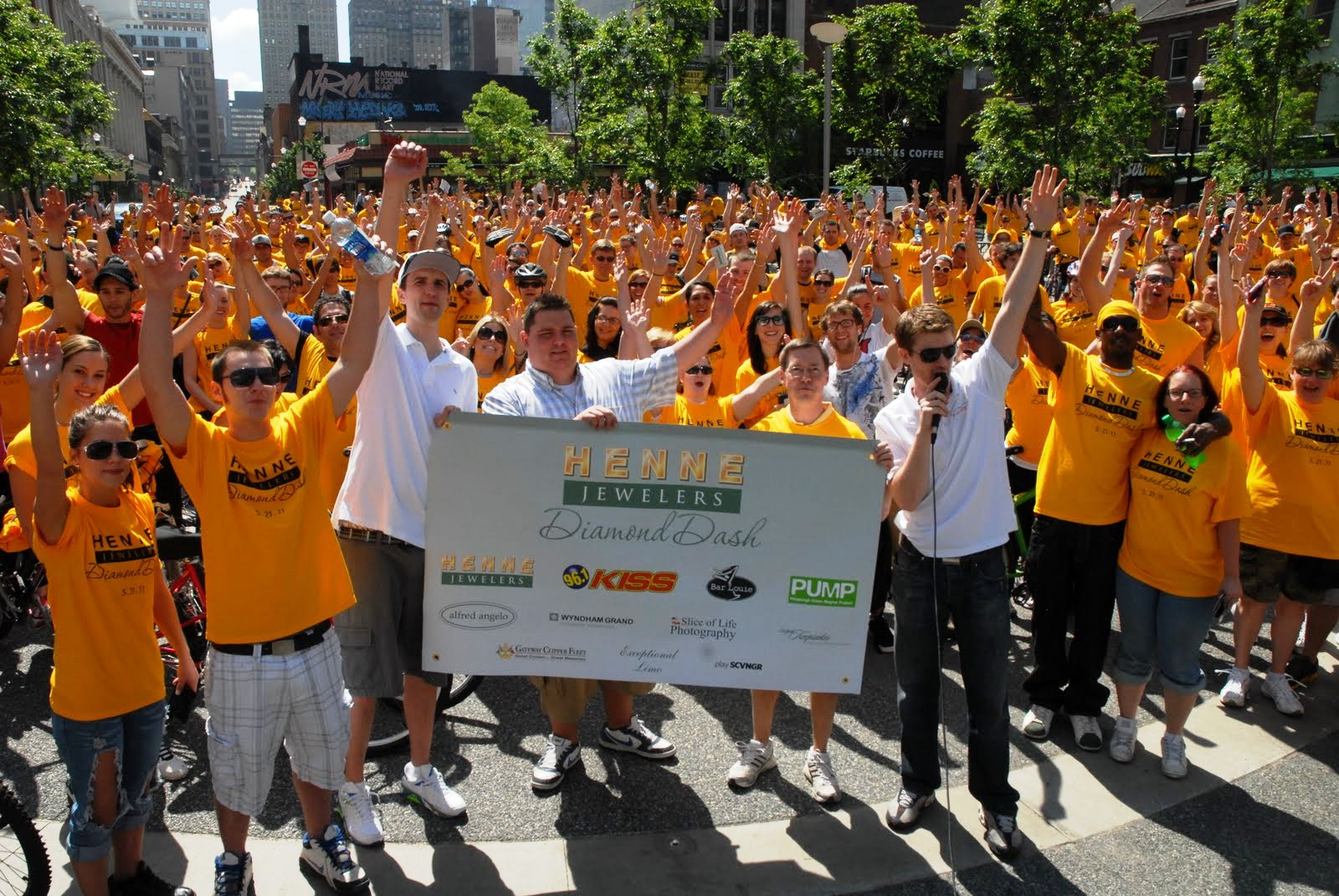
Henne Jewelers Diamond Dash

=== Robberies ===
On January 11, 2010, in the middle of the day, two men held the store's employees at gun point and used a crowbar to break a case open and steal jewelry. Then, on January 19, 2010, a burglar used a sport utility vehicle to crash through the store's front doors. The burglar stole jewelry valued at only a few thousand dollars, but the cost of damages to the door and property were estimated to be around $20,000. There was a large amount of media attention because this was the second robbery for the store in little more than a week. These were the first robberies since the store was held up and ransacked 43 years earlier.

=== Diamond Dash ===
The Henne Jewelers Diamond Dash is a citywide treasure hunt that Henne facilitated in 2010 and 2011. In this event, contestants are given clues via text messages and race to receive a $15,000 Mark Patterson engagement ring. The number of contestants in the 2011 Diamond Dash were over 800.

=== To Have and To Hold ===
The "To Have and To Hold" packet is a gift that Henne Jewelers Sales Associates give to engaged and married couples. The gift packet contains special offers from Henne Jewelers along with quizzes to help couples better understand one another.

=== Recognition ===
| Local | National |
|---|---|
| "Best Jeweler" Pittsburgh Magazine 2009, 2010, 2011, 2013 | Harper's Bazaar Jewelry Leader |
| "Best Jewelry Store" Pittsburgh City Paper: 2011 & 2008 Runner Up, 2010 Winner | America's Best Jewelers |
| 2007 Pittsburgh Business Ethics Award |
| Pittsburgh Best Places to Work 2011, 2012, 2013 |
