= Kyle Holbrook =

American muralist and activist

Kyle Holbrook is an American muralist and activist best known for his street art in Pittsburgh, Pennsylvania and Miami, Florida.

== Youth and education ==
Kyle Holbrook was raised in the Wilkinsburg neighborhood of Pittsburgh, Pennsylvania, where he was exposed to gang violence during high school secondary. He has stated that this upbringing inspired his efforts to employ local teenagers during his public mural projects. Holbrook later attended the Art Institute of Pittsburgh where in 2002 he earned a degree in graphic design.

== Artwork ==
Holbrook’s first works were painted on the buildings of the communities of the Pittsburgh Housing Authority, commercial buildings in the Pittsburgh area, and the Port Authority. An early commission included a 65-foot mural in the area of the Monroeville Mall. In 2005 Holbrook co-produced the Martin Luther King mural with artists Chris Savido and George Gist at the corner of Wood Street and Franklin Avenue. The location is nearby where several of Holbrook’s childhood friends were murdered. Holbrook’s mural We Fall Down but We Get Back up, located on Paulson Street in Pittsburgh, Pennsylvania, was painted in 2008, and incorporates the faces of the community activists that lobbied the city for the mural’s public creation. Holbrook has painted more than two hundred murals in the City of Pittsburgh, some done through his company KH Design. He has painted several murals in London in 2015. Holbrook and Hong Kong artist Cara To had a disagreement over their collaborative work in August 2016, for a mural in Pittsburgh's Mexican War Streets neighborhood, for which Holbrook terminated To's employment. Holbrook later filed suit, in April 2018, against numerous public and private entities in Pittsburgh over destruction of his artworks, based on the federal Visual Artists Rights Act. As of 2021, Holbrook had produced public murals in 43 US states and 40 different countries globally. In the late 2010s he relocated his residence to Miami, Florida.

=== National tours ===
In early 2021, he undertook several messenging murals in major US cities to advocate pandemic mask use during his "Mask up campaign". The murals in San Francisco, for example, featured images of famous 1960s rock musicians in medical masks, whereas his mural in Phoenix, Arizona featured an image of Martin Luther King Jr. also wearing a mask. In the summer of 2021, Holbrook undertook a national tour of the United States in order to paint unique murals in the downtowns of various major cities that advocated the end to gun violence - naming it the "National Stop Gun Violence Tour". He stated that the act was in response to the 45 different friends and family from his upbringing that he had seen lost to gun violence over the course of his life.

== Philanthropy ==
Since 2002 Holbrook has served as the executive director and CEO of MLK Mural, also known as “Moving the Lives of Kids Mural Project”, a youth organization that brings mural work to Black communities in the United States and abroad. MLK Mural pays its youth participants with its grant money. An example of its projects was The Broken Windows Project, where 75 abandoned and underused buildings in the Hill District of Pittsburgh were painted in murals by 200 local students led by a team of artists.

Holbrook led the Martin Luther King Jr. East Busway Community Mural Project in 2008, where 100 students helped to paint twenty-six murals throughout the eight neighbourhoods through which the bus route exists. By 2009 the organization had created more than 100 public murals. The organization opened an office in Miami in 2010, creating fifty murals in the city area by 2015. Other locations the organization has created work include Detroit, Atlanta, Brazil, Haiti, Uganda, and Portugal. Holbrook sits on the board of the August Wilson Center for African American Culture.

== Films ==
Holbrook directed the film Art of Life in 2013.
