= Shadyside (Pittsburgh) =

- Neighborhood of Pittsburgh
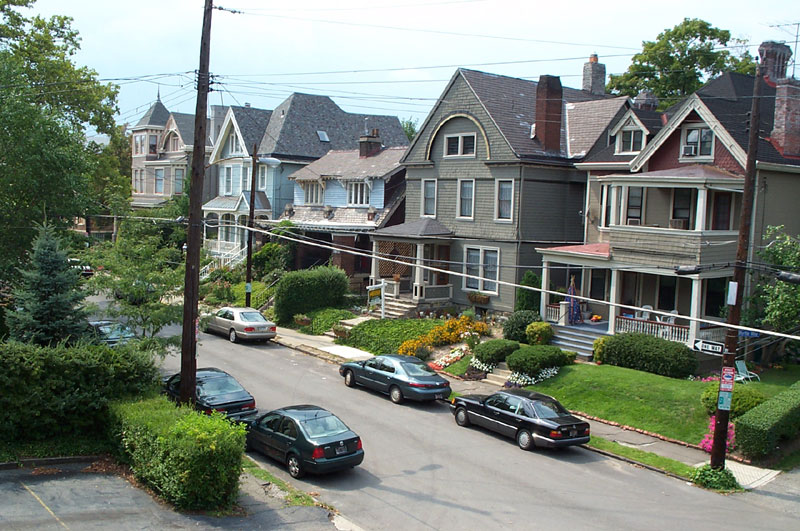
- Street in Shadyside, 2001

- Coordinates: 40.450°N 79.935°W
- Country: United States
- State: Pennsylvania
- County: Allegheny County
- City: Pittsburgh

Area
  - Total: 0.921 sq mi (2.39 km^{2})

Population (2010)
  - Total: 13,915
  - Density: 15,100/sq mi (5,830/km^{2})

Shadyside is a neighborhood in the East End of Pittsburgh, Pennsylvania, United States. It has three zip codes (15206, 15213, and 15232) and representation on Pittsburgh City Council by the council member for District 8 (East Central Neighborhoods). Shadyside is drawn from the name of a 19th-century Pennsylvania Railroad station in the area, which was named for its shady lanes.

Notable neighborhood institutions include UPMC Shadyside hospital, a member of the University of Pittsburgh Medical Center; Chatham University, which is located just across the southern edge of the neighborhood in Squirrel Hill, along with Pittsburgh Center for the Arts, which sits inside Mellon Park.

== Business districts ==
Shadyside is home to many upscale stores and boutiques. In Shadyside, businesses are located along three corridors: Walnut Street, Ellsworth Avenue, and S. Highland Avenue. Given the compact nature of this historic residential neighborhood, the three business corridors are all within walking distance of one another.

=== Walnut Street ===
Walnut Street's business district is home to several national chains and locally owned businesses. Among them, Pamela's Diner gained publicity in 2009 when it served then President Barack Obama, his wife Michelle Obama and 80 veterans during a Memorial Day breakfast.

The Jam on Walnut is a summer concert series that features local and regional music concerts. The concerts are held on the last Saturday of each summer month on the corner of Bellefonte and Walnut Street. Proceeds from beer sales go to Cystic Fibrosis. Walnut Street also hosts the Shadyside Arts Festival, a juried art show. This late summer/early fall street fair has been held on Walnut Street for so long that the event has been renamed "The Art Festival on Walnut Street."

=== Ellsworth Avenue ===
Retail options on Ellsworth Avenue are typically smaller locally owned businesses, including vintage clothing, an art gallery and beauty salons. Ellsworth has a number of restaurants also features one of Pittsburgh's gay friendly bars.

=== South Highland Avenue ===
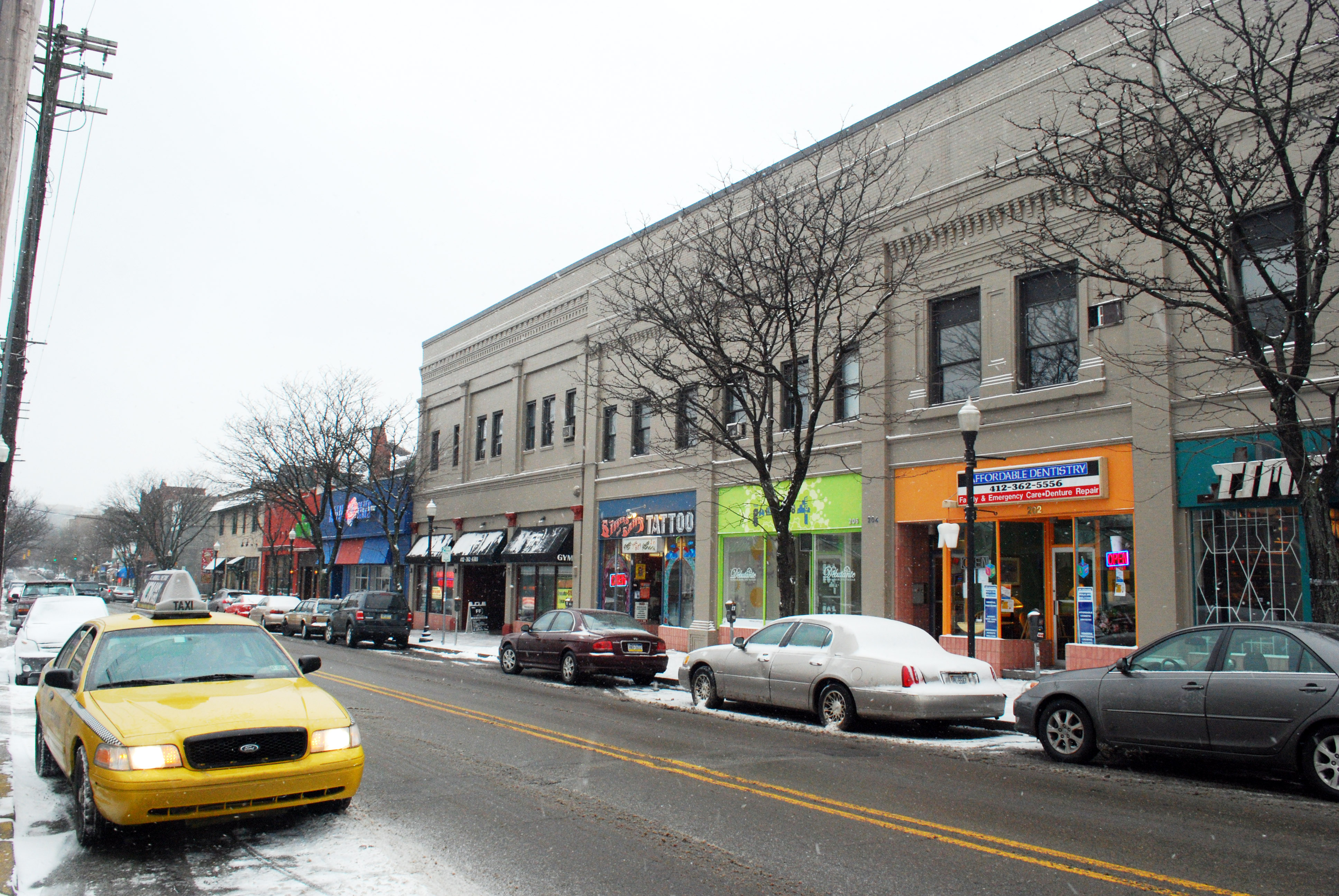
Storefronts along South Highland Avenue.

S. Highland Avenue features several upscale design and furniture stores, local restaurants and cafes. Also on S. Highland is the entrance to East Liberty's Eastside retail complex, which features many food options.

== Residential Shadyside ==
Since the 1920s, residential Shadyside has been home to a mix of affluent families, young professionals, artists, musicians, students, and apartment dwellers. The residential areas of the neighborhood include Victorian mansions along with modern apartments and condominiums. The neighborhood has a compact layout, which prevents most houses from having garages. Public transportation is available via Pittsburgh Regional Transit bus system; express busway stops are located in the neighborhood on Negley Avenue (between Ellsworth and Centre avenues) and on Ellsworth Avenue at Shady Avenue.

== Schools ==
The Shadyside school district consists mainly of The Liberty School, a public school; and private schools, Winchester Thurston School, The Ellis School, and Shadyside Academy.

The Liberty School is located in the Shadyside area of Pittsburgh, and consists of grades pre-kindergarten to fifth. The school's colors are navy and white and its mascot is the soaring eagle. It was built in 1872, and in 1911, the industrial arts portion of the school was built. From the years 1911 to 1934, the first and older building instilled primary instruction- such as the core subjects of learning- while the newer building offered woodworking, home economics, and other courses. In 1934, the eldest building was completely torn down to further renovate the school. Therefore, the newest building was attached to the 1911 building, consisting of both classrooms and an auditorium. Later on in the 1990s, playgrounds were constructed on both sides of the buildings providing more recreation for the students.

Liberty is a "magnet school," which merely means it is a public school with specialized courses and therefore draws in a diverse group of students.

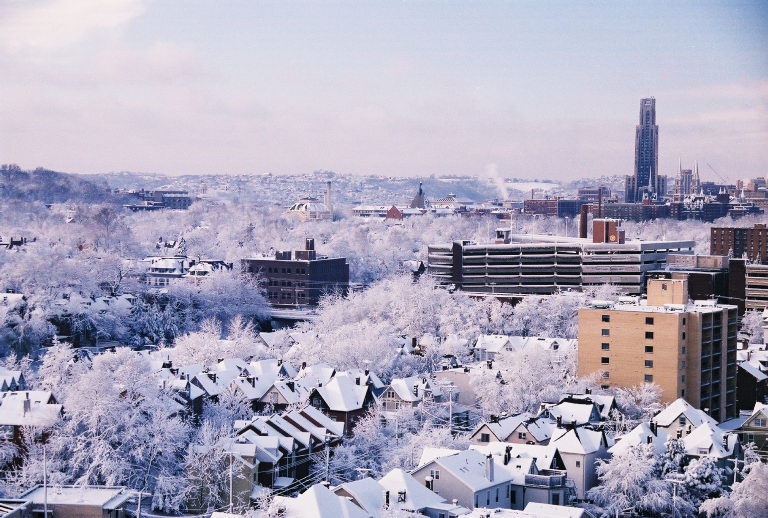
Shadyside in winter

Liberty's approximate student enrollment is 375 students per school year, with a student to teacher ratio of about 16:1. The percentage of males and females is fairly equal, with 45% male and 55% female.

The Winchester Thurston School is a private co-ed institution located in Shadyside. It has two campuses-the North Hills campus in Allison Park and the city campus in Shadyside.

The Ellis School is an independent school for girls ages three through grade twelve in Shadyside, Pittsburgh, Pennsylvania. It was established in 1916 by Sara Frazer Ellis.

The Ellis School and the Winchester Thurston School are both part of the Pittsburgh Consortium of Independent Schools (PCIS) which is a non-profit organization consisting of these and eleven other independent schools in the area.

Shady Side Academy, though founded in the neighborhood in 1883, is no longer located in the Shadyside neighborhood. The school originally occupied the present-day site of the Winchester Thurston School as an all-male day school, but relocated its Senior and Middle School campuses to suburban Fox Chapel in the 1920s. Its Junior School campus, however, remains in the city in nearby Point Breeze.

== Shadyside Action Coalition ==
The Shadyside Action Coalition, known colloquially as SAC, is a community organization. This not-for-profit organization was formed in 1973. According to their website, their goals are to, "preserve values and laws of this community"; the issues they have chosen to focus on are "neighborhood safety, planning and zoning, parking, quality of life, preserving the character of the community, and being actively involved with the future development of our community".

== History ==
Shadyside was originally named after a local farm, and was annexed to Pittsburgh in 1868.

== Gallery ==
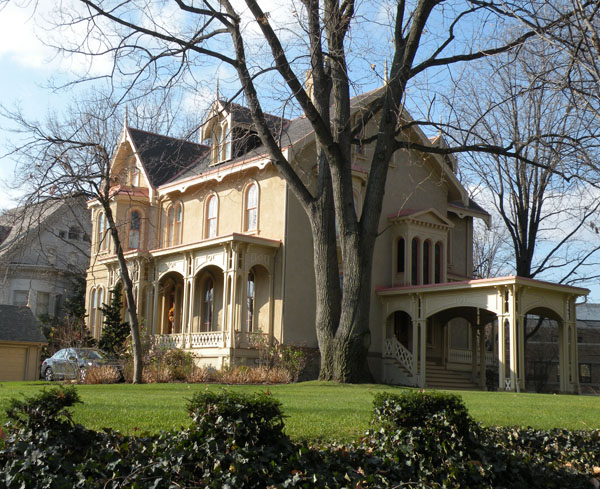
Sellers House, built in 1858, at 400 Shady Avenue.

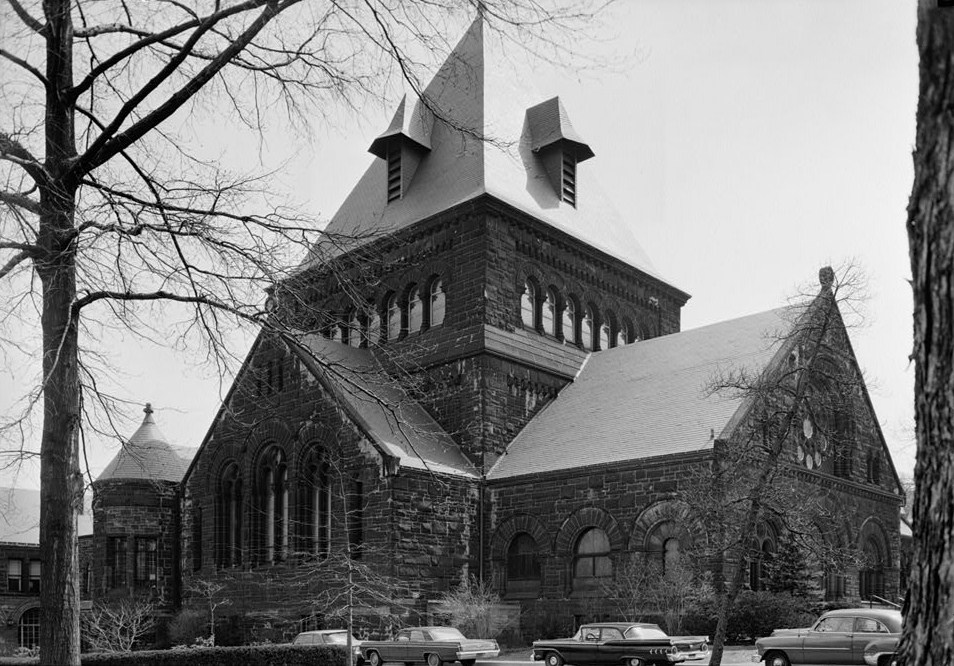
Shadyside Presbyterian Church, built in 1890, at 5121 Westminster Place (at the corner of Amberson Avenue and Westminster Place).

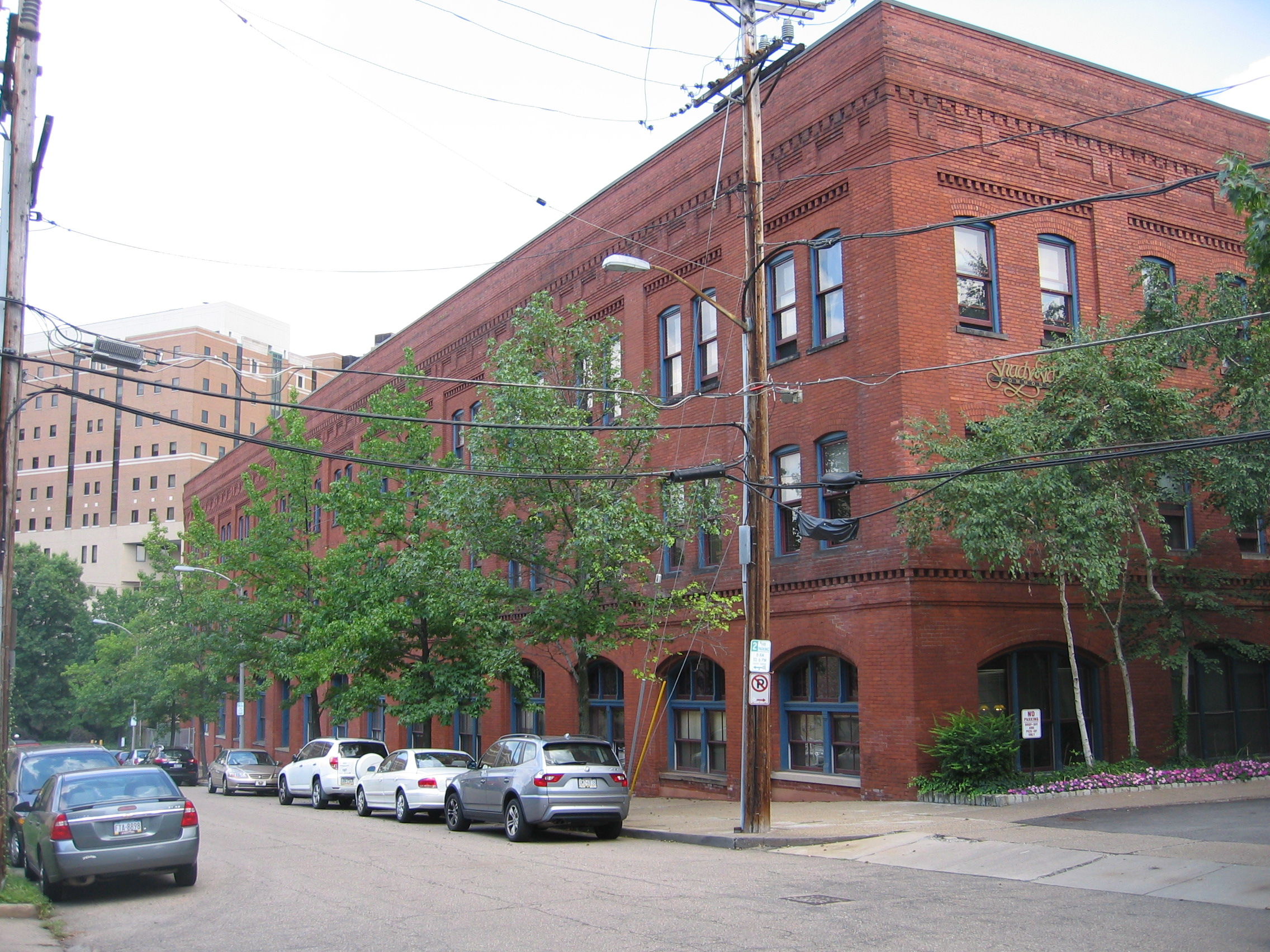
Bindley Hardware Company Building, built in 1903, at 401 Amberson Avenue.

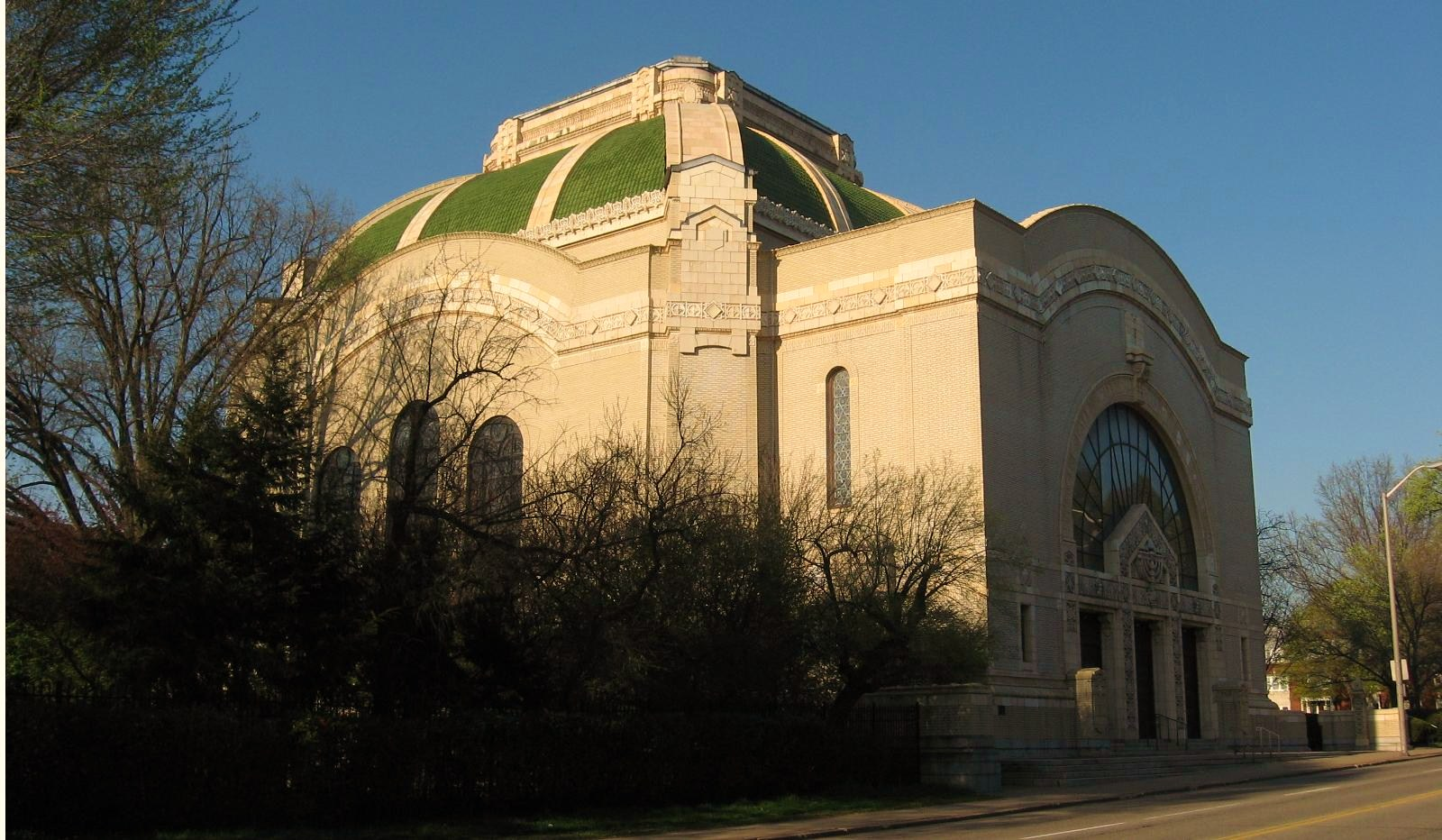
Rodef Shalom, built in 1906, at 4905 5th Avenue.

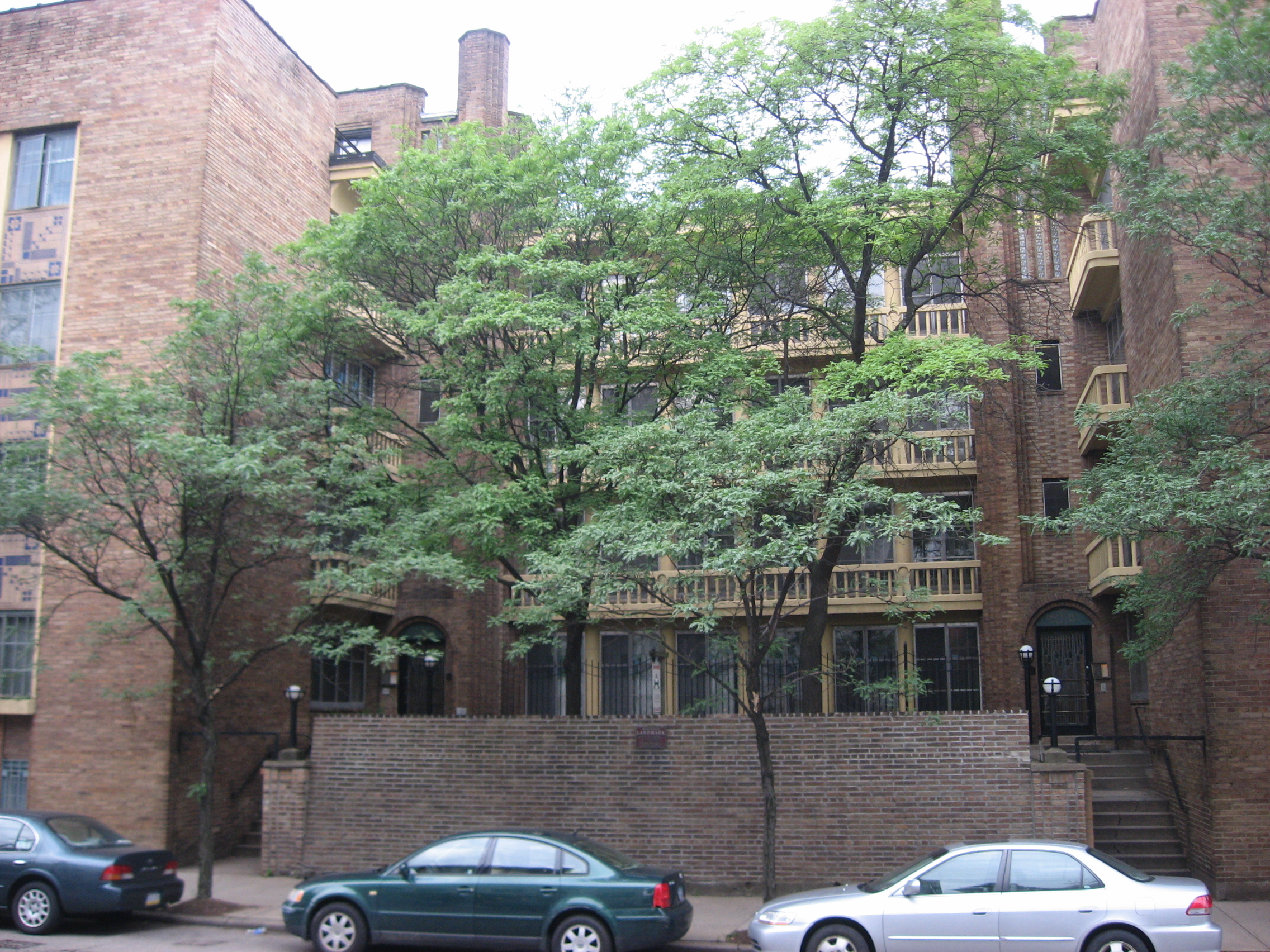
Highland Towers Apartments, built in 1913, at 340 South Highland Avenue.

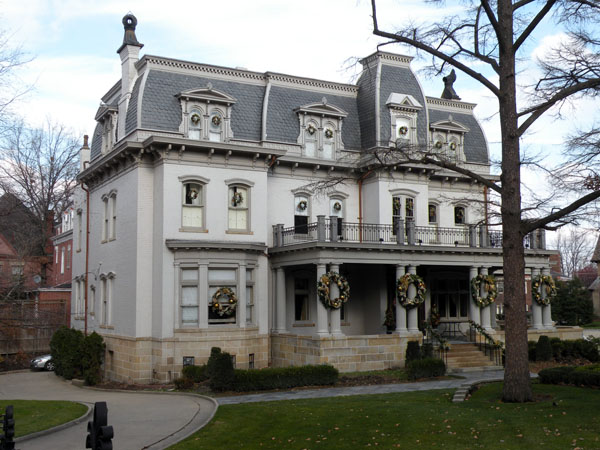
Negley-Gwinner-Harter House, built in 1870 and 1871, at 5061 Fifth Avenue.

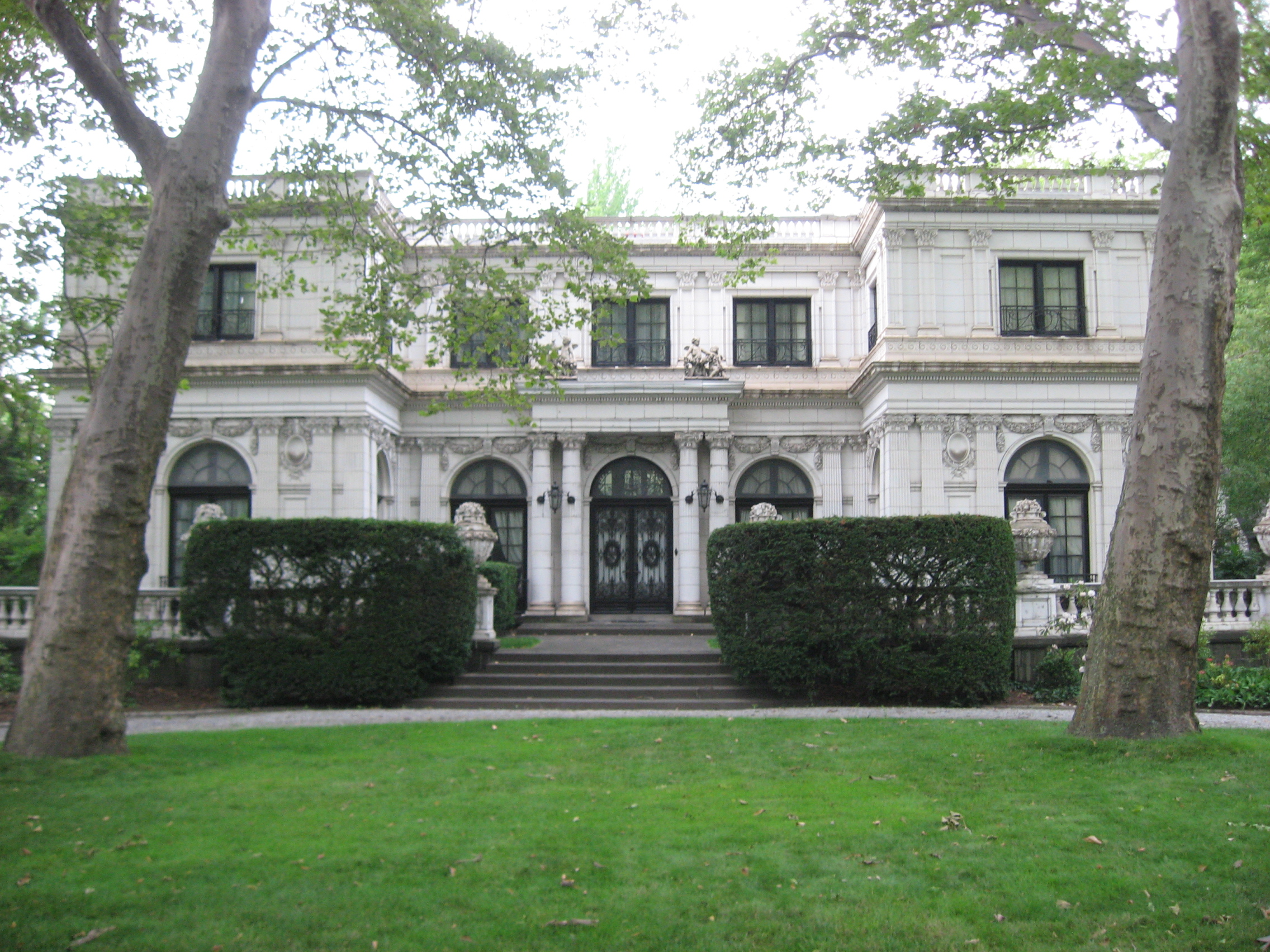
Moreland-Hoffstot House, built in 1914, at 5057 Fifth Avenue.

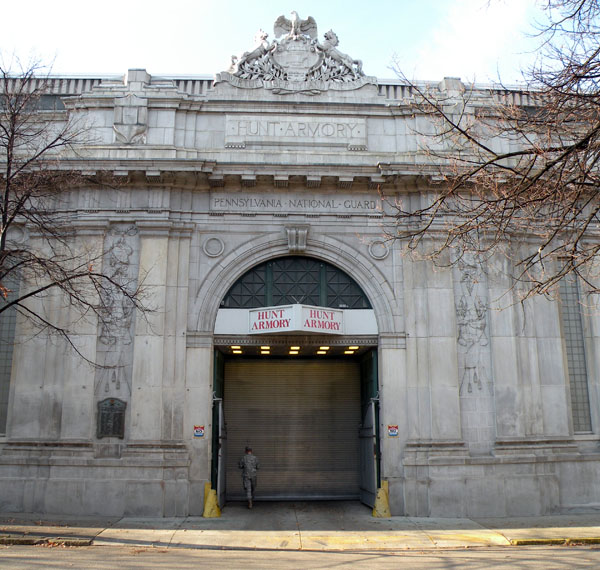
Hunt Armory, built in 1916, at 324 Emerson Street.

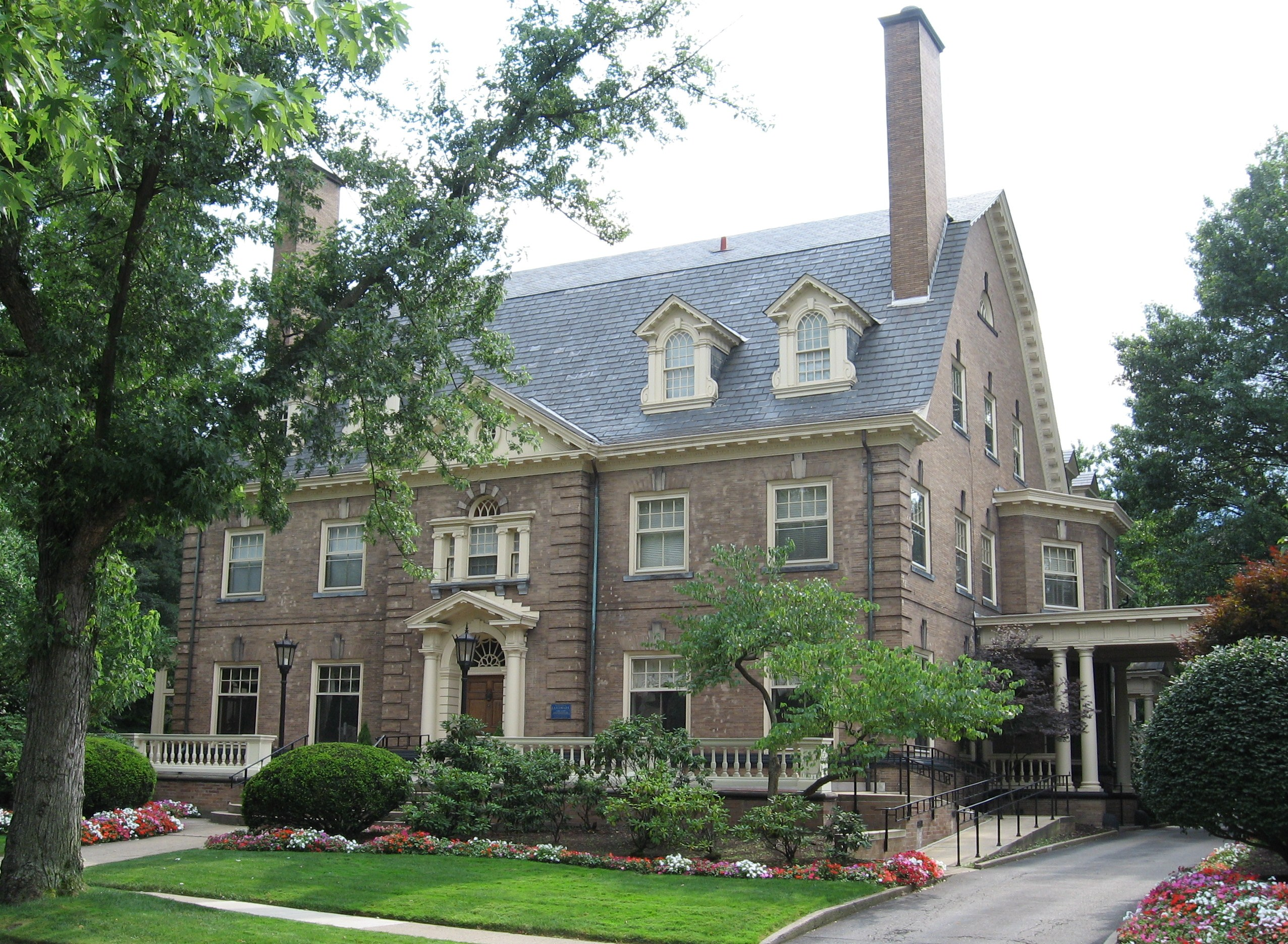
Harvey Childs House, built in 1896, at 718 Devonshire Street.

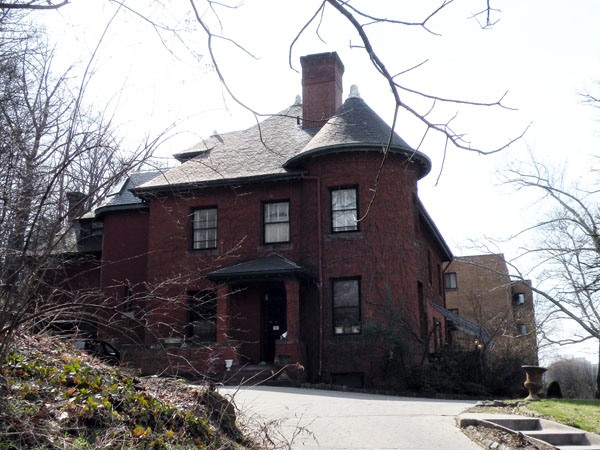
Sunnyledge, built in 1886, at 5124 Fifth Avenue.

== See also ==
- List of Pittsburgh neighborhoods
- S.W Randall Toyes & Gifts
