= Liberty Avenue (Pittsburgh) =

Street in Pittsburgh, Pennsylvania, United States

Coordinates: 40.45537°N 79.97617°W

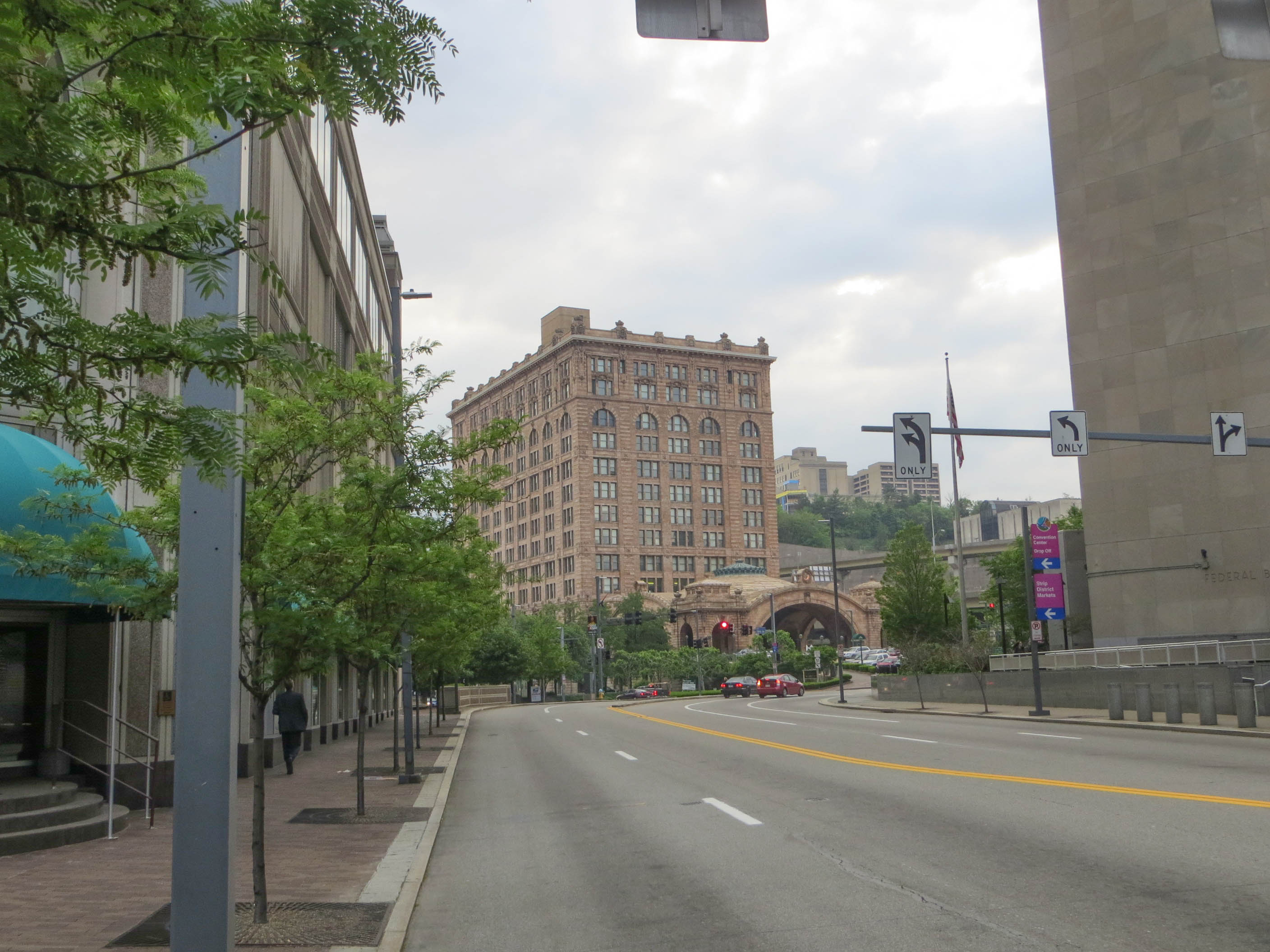
- Liberty Avenue near 10th Avenue with Union Station visible in the background
- Interactive map of Liberty Avenue
- Length: 4.3 mi (6.9 km)
- Location: Pittsburgh
- West end: I-376 / US 22 / US 30 in Downtown
- Major junctions: Stanwix Street in Downtown; Penn Avenue in Downtown; Fifth Avenue in Downtown; Grant Street in Downtown; PA 380 (Baum Blvd) in Bloomfield
- East end: Aiken Avenue in Shadyside

Liberty Avenue is a major thoroughfare starting in downtown Pittsburgh, Pennsylvania, United States, just outside Point State Park. Liberty Avenue runs through Downtown Pittsburgh, the Strip District, and Bloomfield and ends in the neighborhood of Shadyside at its intersection with Centre Avenue and Aiken Avenue. Liberty Avenue is about 4.3 miles (6.9 km) long.

A survey of Pittsburgh in 1784 already shows a Liberty Street in its present location. It is also called Liberty Street in a map from 1860.

== Downtown ==
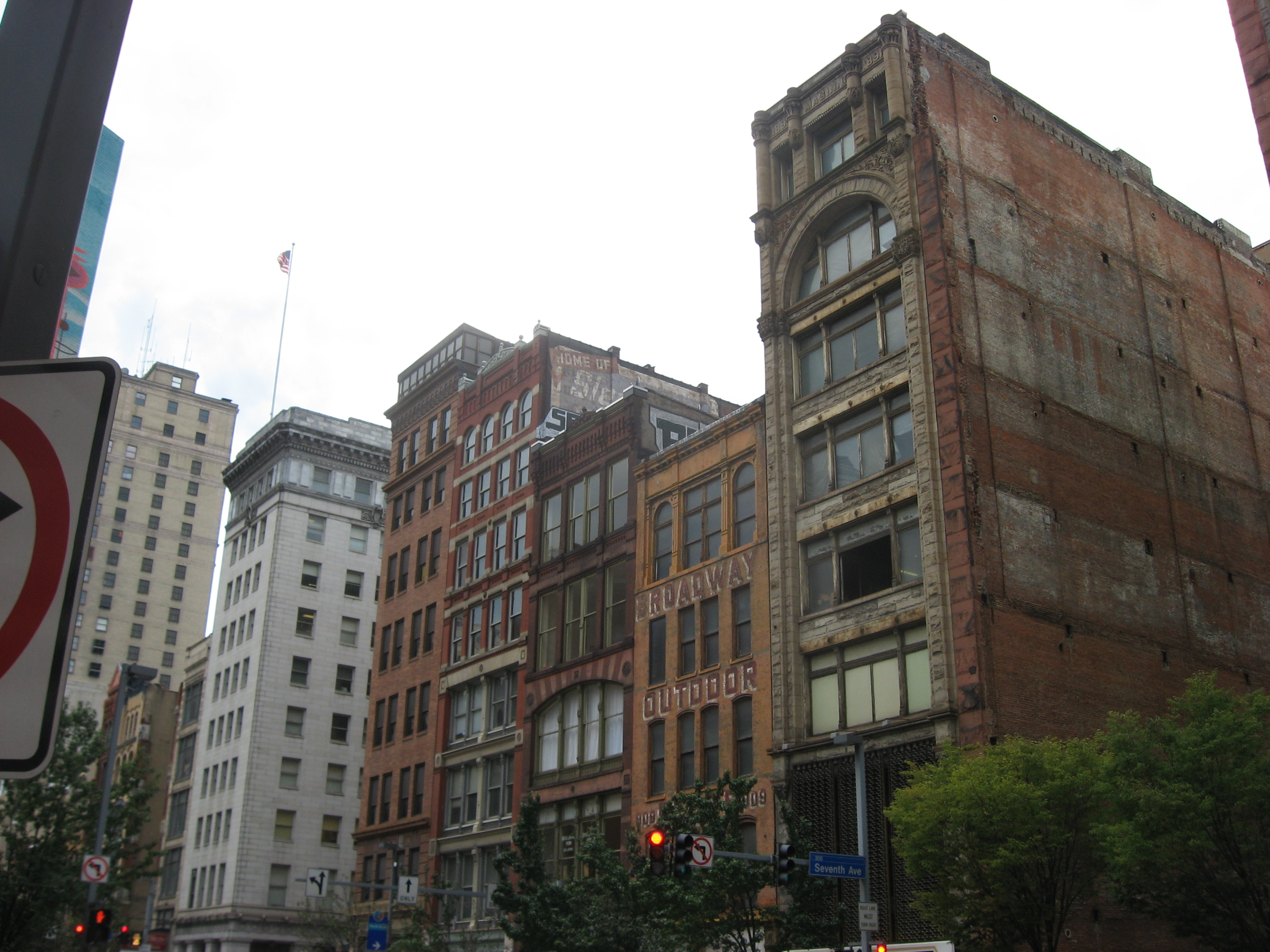
Buildings along Liberty Avenue

Beginning in the 19th century, the thoroughfare became a place of middle- and upper-class commerce. A history of Pittsburgh notes that a Market House was established in 1832 along Liberty Street between Sixth Street and Cecil Alley. Liberty also hosted food suppliers, brewers, and small manufacturers. In 1894, the Joseph Horne department store was built there. In the early 20th century, the Clark Building (named for the Clark candy company) and the Second National Bank were built. At length, it became a home for theater and movies, with the Stanley Theatre, the Lowe's Penn and the Harris Theatre. However, much of this activity was checked, first by the Great Depression, and then by the St. Patrick's Day Flood of 1936. Some businesses were closed, and others moved elsewhere.

A section of Liberty Avenue in Downtown Pittsburgh became a red-light district in the 1970s and 1980s, hosting the city's sex industry, including burlesque houses, strip bars, and peep shows, and attracting vice and crime. The Pittsburgh Cultural Trust, formed in 1984, worked over the next 25 years to transform the area into the Cultural District, a center for the arts, eventually bringing the August Wilson Center for African American Culture, Bricolage Production Company, Pittsburgh Playwrights Theatre Company, the Pittsburgh Cultural Trust Arts Education Center, and a museum of cartoon art, The ToonSeum, to Liberty Avenue.

Liberty Avenue in the downtown area underwent a years-long extensive $3.6 million redesign and repavement that was completed by 1991.

== Strip District ==
Liberty Avenue is a main road through the Strip District. It is the home to many businesses, mostly offices and business-to-business service and product providers. The factory to manufacture George Westinghouse's air brakes was located at 2425 Liberty. This has now become the home of the Pittsburgh Opera. There are few retail establishments on Liberty Avenue in the Strip District.

== Bloomfield ==
Liberty Avenue is the site of the main business district in Bloomfield. Liberty Avenue is also home to West Penn Hospital as well as many small store fronts.

== Popular culture ==
- A semi-fictionalized version of Liberty Avenue is featured prominently in the American version of the television program Queer as Folk.
- Sharon Needles mentions Liberty Avenue in her song 412/724 Whore.

== Major junctions ==
The entire route is in Pittsburgh, Allegheny County.

mi	km	Destinations	Notes
		I-376 west / US 22 west / US 30 west (Penn Lincoln Parkway) – Carnegie, Pittsburgh International Airport Commonwealth Place to I-376 east / US 22 east / US 30 east (Penn Lincoln Parkway) / I-279 north	Western terminus of Liberty Avenue
		Penn Avenue	Westbound entrance only
		Purple Belt (Stanwix Street)	
		Fifth Avenue	
		Purple Belt (Grant Street) – PPG Paints Arena; East Busway	Western terminus of concurrency with Purple Belt
		Purple Belt (11th Street)	Eastern terminus of concurrency with Purple Belt
		15th Street to I-279	
		26th Street - East Busway	
		Bloomfield Bridge / Main Street to PA 380 (Bigelow Boulevard)	
		PA 380 (Baum Boulevard) / Aiken Avenue	Eastern terminus of Liberty Avenue
1.000 mi = 1.609 km; 1.000 km = 0.621 mi: Concurrency terminus; Incomplete access
