= Penn Avenue =

Major arterial street in Pittsburgh and Wilkinsburg in Pennsylvania

Coordinates: 40.44381°N 79.93824°W

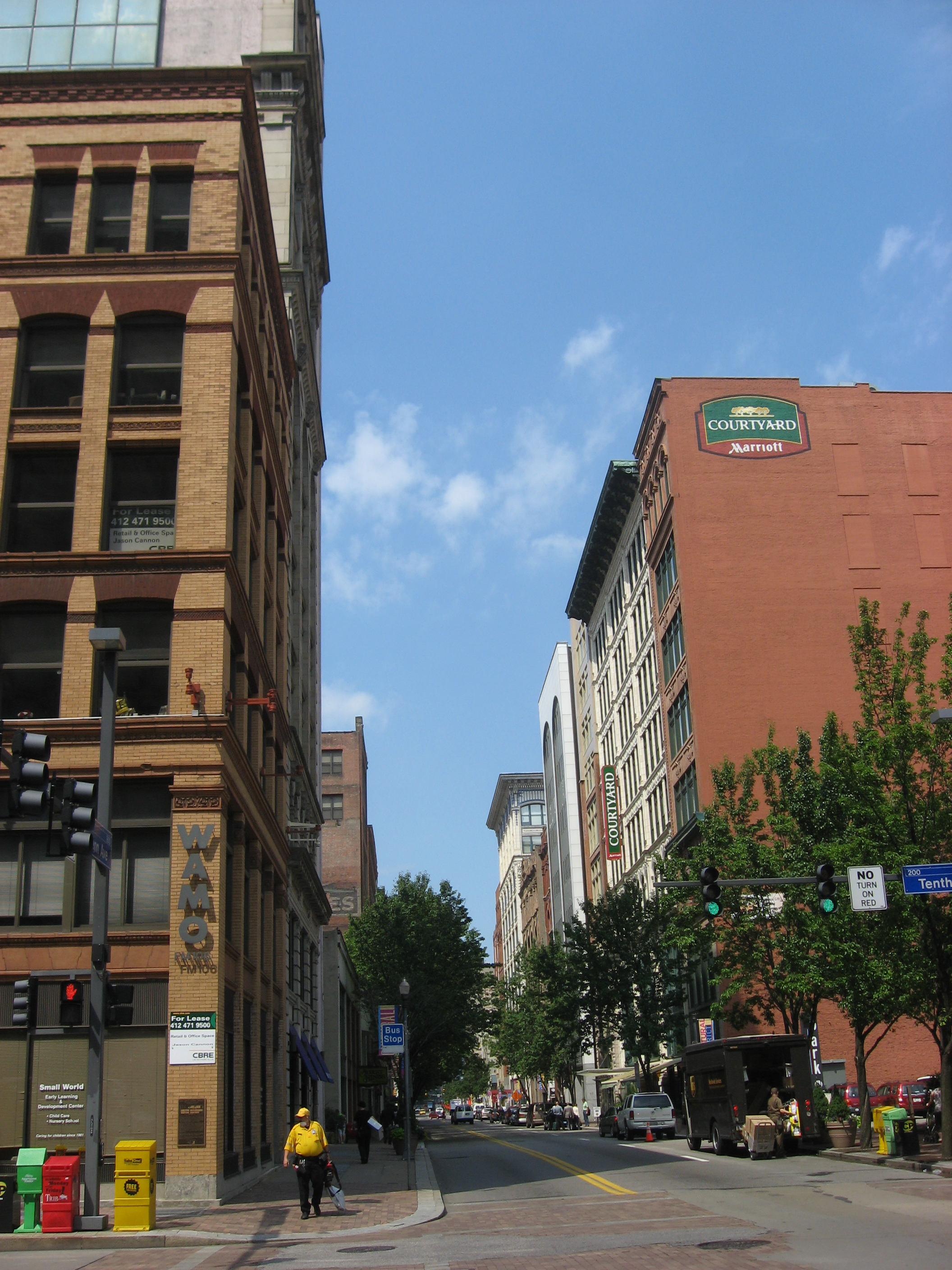
- The 900 block of Penn Avenue.
- Interactive map of Penn Avenue
- Length: 8.7 mi (14.0 km)
- Component highways: PA 380 between Centre Avenue and Dallas Avenue; PA 8 between Fifth Avenue and Ardmore Blvd
- Location: Pittsburgh
- West end: Liberty Avenue in Downtown
- Major junctions: Stanwix Street in Downtown; Fifth Avenue in Downtown; PA 380 (Centre Avenue) in East Liberty; PA 8 (Fifth Avenue) in Larimer; PA 8 (Ardmore Blvd) in Wilkinsburg
- East end: Greensburg Pike near Wilkinsburg

Penn Avenue is a major arterial street in Pittsburgh and Wilkinsburg, in Pennsylvania, United States. Its western terminus lies at Gateway Center in downtown Pittsburgh. For its westernmost ten blocks it serves as the core of the Cultural District with such attractions as Heinz Hall, the Benedum Center and the Byham Theater as well as the David L. Lawrence Convention Center and the Heinz History Center bordering it. Exiting downtown it is the major route through the city's Strip District, Lawrenceville, Bloomfield, Garfield and East Liberty neighborhoods. Its eastern portion exits the city at Wilkinsburg where it continues to exist as Penn Avenue with a numbering system that begins anew using small numbers as it approaches Interstate 376 the "Parkway East". Penn Avenue is about 8.7 miles (14.0 km) long.

From downtown, Penn Avenue travels in the same general direction as the Allegheny River, thus it passes close by a number of the bridges of the city that cross that river. In the downtown area, Penn Avenue is the main bisecting street of the Three Sister Bridges that form the Roberto Clemente Bridge, Andy Warhol Bridge and Rachel Carson Bridge. It passes the 16th Street Bridge, and goes straight through the Strip District.

Duolingo's HQ are located in this street.

== History ==
Before being named Penn Avenue it was known as the Great Road, being perhaps the only road leading from east of the Allegheny Mountains to the headwaters of the Ohio River. It may have been known as the Great Road when George Washington traveled it, in 1753. In the 18th century, settlers entered the area from the eastern part of Pennsylvania via a road which came to be called the Greensburg Pike early in the 19th century. The road passed through a tiny settlement which grew to become Greensburg, Pa. In Pittsburgh, Greensburg Pike became Penn Avenue, therefore, Penn Avenue is the oldest and most historically significant street in Pittsburgh.

== Bike infrastructure ==
In early 2014, the City of Pittsburgh announced the installation of the first set of protected bike lanes in the area. After deliberation, it was decided that Penn Avenue would be the candidate for the lanes. The eastbound lane of Penn Avenue was removed from the David McCullough Bridge to 6th Street in Downtown to provide protected bike lanes. The lanes have provided bikers with a safe and effective way of leaving Downtown.

== Major junctions ==
The entire route is in Allegheny County.

Location	mi	km	Destinations	Notes
Pittsburgh			Liberty Avenue	Western terminus; westbound entrance only
Pittsburgh			Purple Belt (Stanwix Street)	
Pittsburgh			Fifth Avenue/Cecil Place	Western terminus of Fifth Avenue
Pittsburgh			Purple Belt (11th Street)	
Pittsburgh			31st Street – 31st Street Bridge	Transition from one-way westbound street to two-way street
Pittsburgh			Main Street	
Pittsburgh			Friendship Avenue	
Pittsburgh			PA 380 west (Euclid Avenue)	Western end of concurrency with PA 380
Pittsburgh			Centre Avenue	
Pittsburgh			East Liberty Boulevard	
Pittsburgh			PA 8 north / Blue Belt (Fifth Avenue) – Sharpsburg	Western end of concurrency with PA 8
Pittsburgh			PA 380 east (Dallas Avenue)	Eastern end of concurrency with PA 380
Wilkinsburg			Green Belt – Sharpsburg	Western end of concurrency with PA 8
Wilkinsburg			PA 8 south / Ross Avenue (Ardmore Boulevard) – Forest Hills	Eastern end of concurrency with PA 8
Wilkinsburg			Greensburg Pike/Limecrest Road	Eastern terminus; road continues as William Penn Highway
1.000 mi = 1.609 km; 1.000 km = 0.621 mi: Concurrency terminus; Incomplete access
