= Grant Street =

Road in Pittsburgh, Pennsylvania, United States

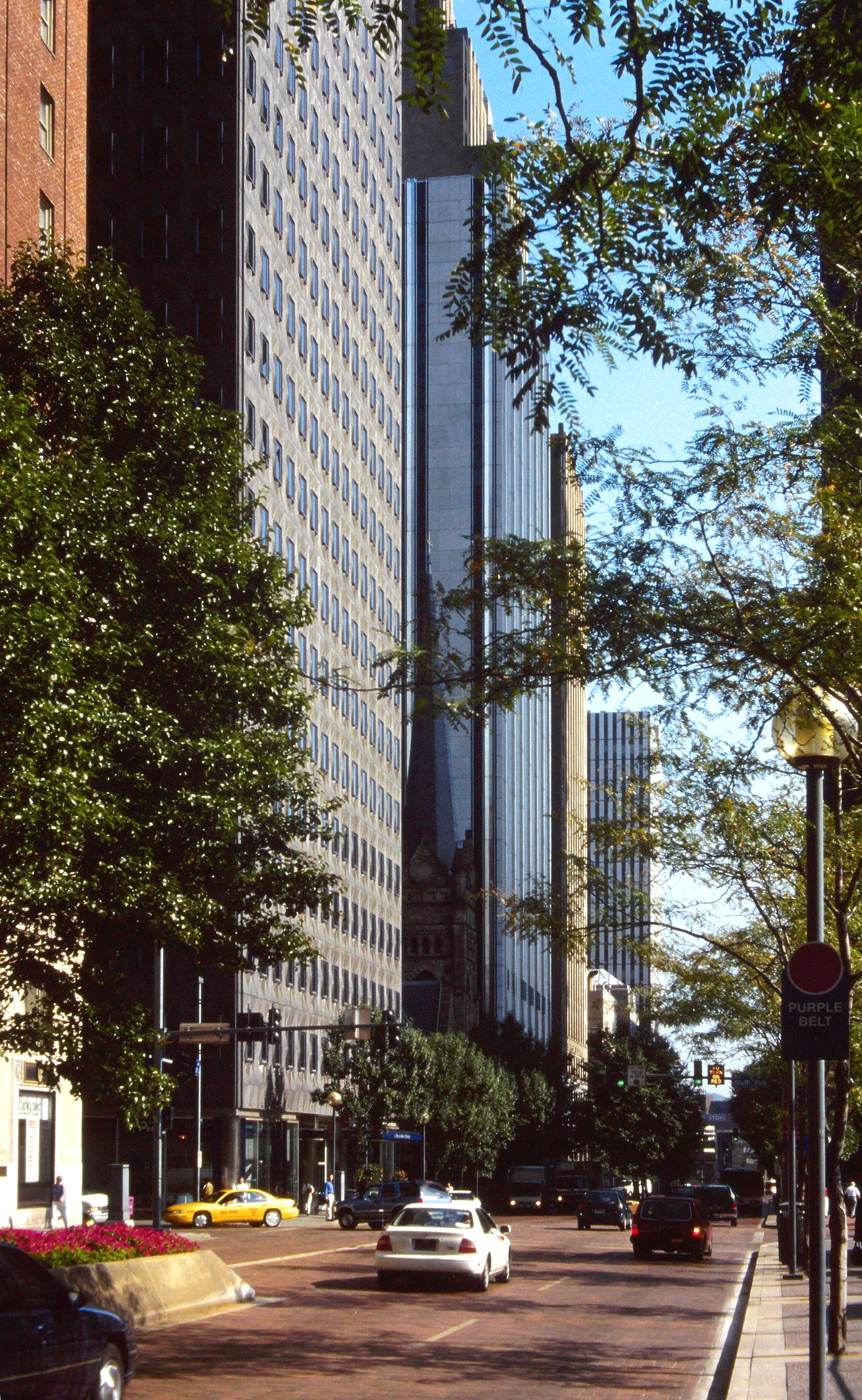
- Grant Street looking northbound
- Interactive map of Grant Street
- Location: Pittsburgh, Pennsylvania
- South end: I-376 / US 22 / US 30 in Downtown
- Major junctions: Fort Pitt Boulevard in Downtown; Blvd of the Allies in Downtown Fourth Avenue in Downtown; Forbes Avenue in Downtown; Fifth Avenue in Downtown
- North end: Liberty Avenue in Downtown

Grant Street is the main government and business corridor in Pittsburgh, Pennsylvania. It is home to the global headquarters of U.S. Steel, Koppers Chemicals, and Oxford Development. It also is home to the seat of Allegheny County, City of Pittsburgh and the regional Federal Government offices. It is part of the Pittsburgh Central Downtown Historic District.

== History ==
Grant Street was named after British Major General James Grant, who was defeated by the French at that location during the French and Indian War. The street's location on "Grant's Hill" strangled growth in downtown Pittsburgh, leading to several attempts in 1836 and 1849 to regrade the area to remove the hill. The successful removal of the hill in 1912 cost $800,000 ($26.7 million in 2025 dollars), plus $2.5 million in reimbursement costs for property damaged by the project ($83.4 million in 2025 dollars). For example, the project removed 16 feet of hill near the Allegheny County Courthouse, meaning that the former basement became the modern ground level. The extreme south end of Grant Street—near the Monongahela River and Boulevard of the Allies intersection—was home to Pittsburgh's Chinatown from the 1880s until the 1950s.

Grant Street has long been a central area for civic events, including longtime Mayor and Pennsylvania governor David L. Lawrence's funeral procession in November 1966 attended by Robert F. Kennedy, mayors Joseph M. Barr of Pittsburgh, Jerome Cavanagh of Detroit, James Tate and Richardson Dilworth of Philadelphia, governors William Scranton, James H. Duff, Raymond P. Shafer and John S. Fine along with President Lyndon B. Johnson staff members Robert E. Kintner and W. Marvin Watson, Secretary of Agriculture Orville Freeman and Secretary of the Interior Stewart Udall.

An extensive six-year $15.3 million resurfacing and redesign of Grant Street was completed in August 1990.

== Recognition ==
The American Planning Association named Grant Street one of its 10 Great Streets for 2012, describing it as "Pittsburgh's finest collection of historic buildings and modern skyscrapers, buildings that tell the stories of 20th century aristocrats and architects who shaped the city into an industrial and banking empire."

Its importance to the city is because of its status as the "seat of financial, governmental and legal power" and its "striking architecture". It is the "corporate and government heartbeat" of the city.

After the death of Pittsburgh mayor Richard Caliguiri, his successor Sophie Masloff pursued changing the name of Grant Street to Richard S. Caliguri Boulevard However, resistance to changing the historic street name, even for the beloved deceased mayor, halted that effort.

== Buildings ==
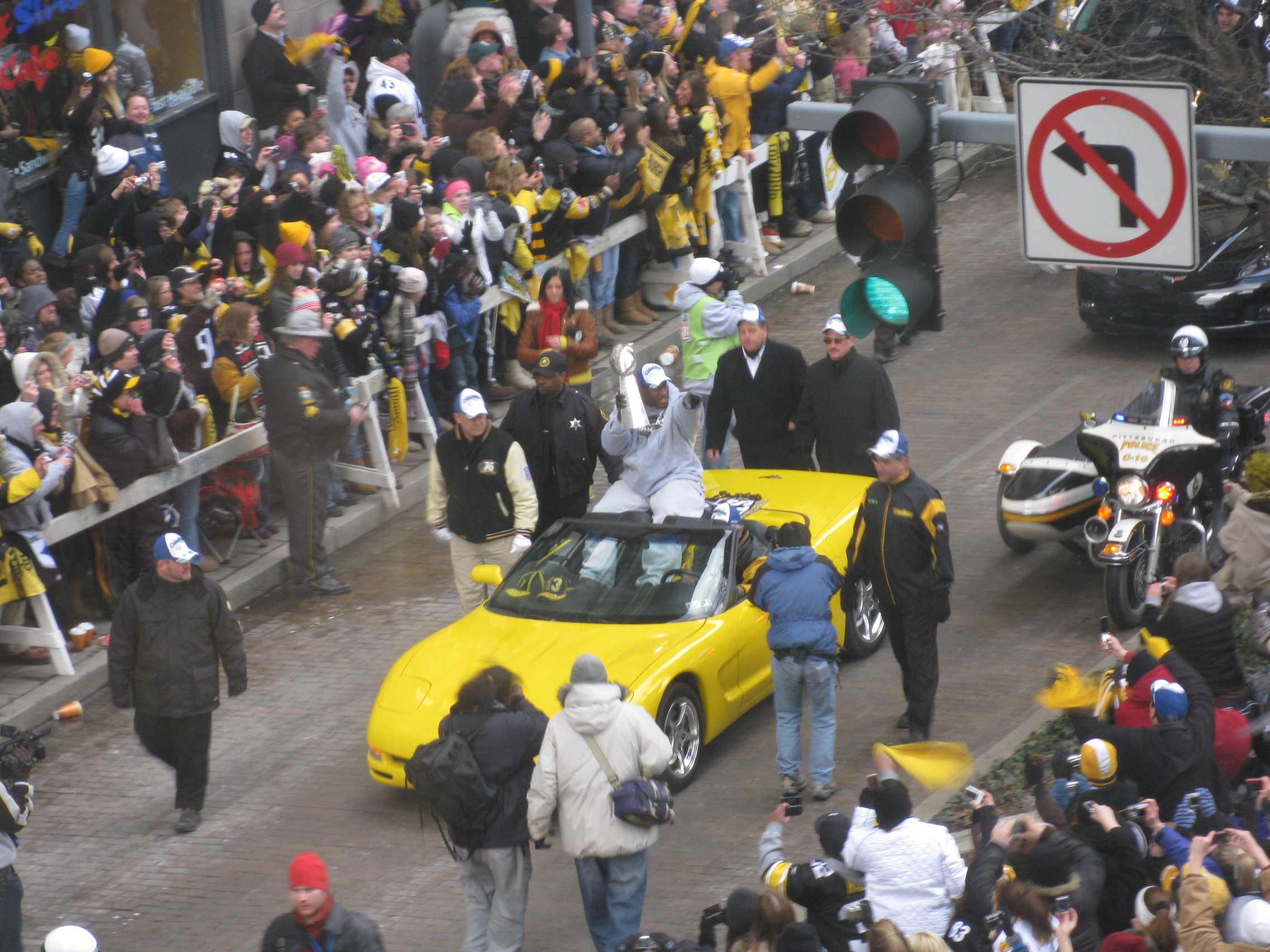
James Harrison in the post Super Bowl XLIII victory parade down Grant Street.

The street stretches for close to 10 blocks on the eastern boundary of Downtown Pittsburgh. Many of Pittsburgh's tallest skyscrapers are on Grant Street.

- William S. Moorhead Federal Building
- Federal Reserve Pittsburgh Branch at 717 Grant Street
- Gulf Tower at 707 Grant Street
- U.S. Post Office & Courthouse at 700 Grant Street
- U.S. Steel Tower at 600 Grant Street
- Koppers Tower at 436 6th Avenue (600 block of Grant Street)
- BNY Mellon Center at 500 Grant Street
- Omni William Penn Hotel
- Union Trust Building
- The Frick Building at 437 Grant Street
- Allegheny County Courthouse
- The Grant Building at 330 Grant Street
- One Oxford Centre
- Pittsburgh City-County Building
