= Stanwix Street =

Street in downtown Pittsburgh, Pennsylvania, United States

Coordinates: 40.44009°N 80.00469°W

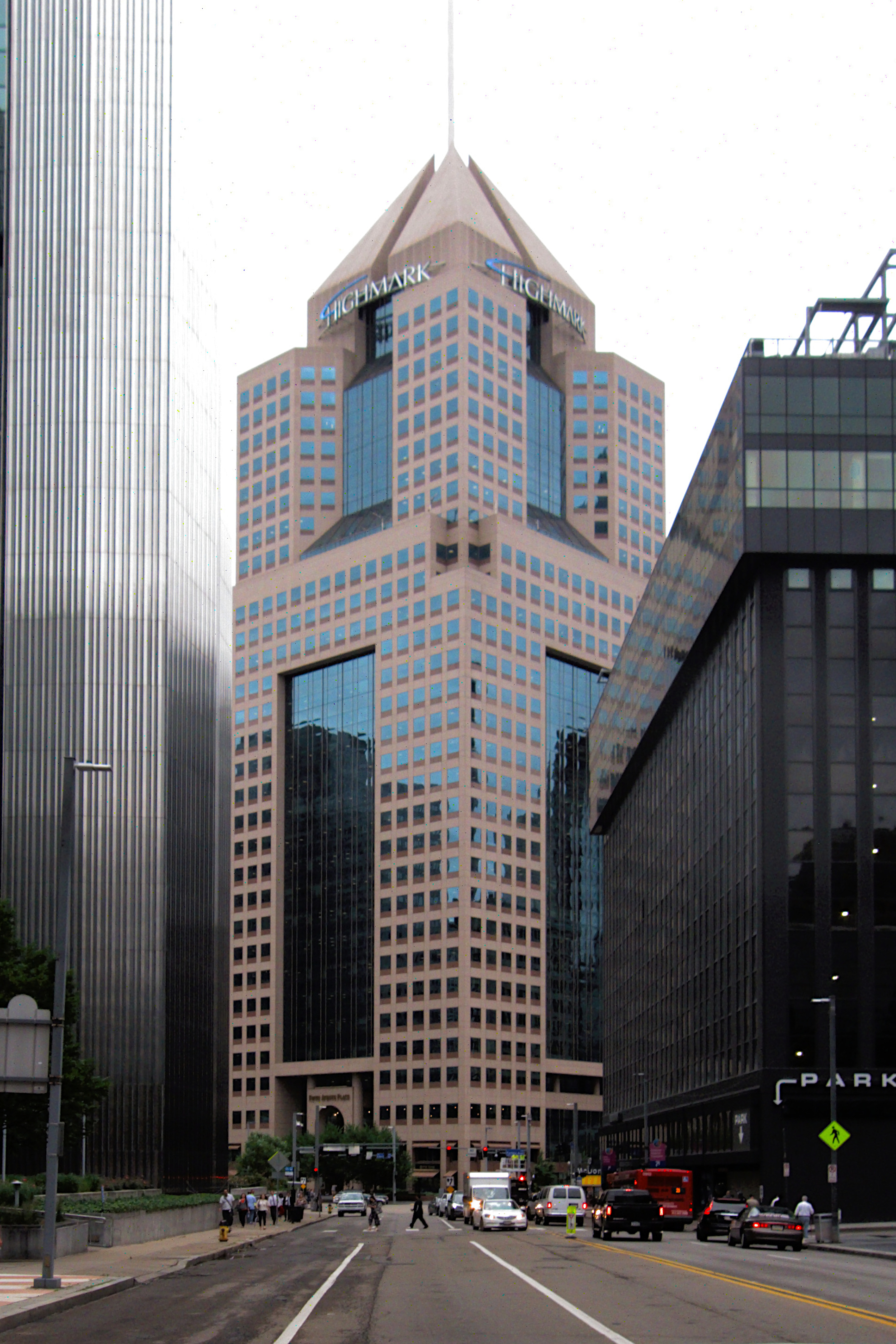
- Stanwix Street northbound with the Fifth Avenue Place building in front
- Interactive map of Stanwix Street
- Length: 0.5 mi (0.80 km)
- Location: Pittsburgh, Pennsylvania
- South end: I-376 / US 22 / US 30 (Fort Pitt Boulevard) in Downtown
- Major junctions: Blvd of the Allies in Downtown Fourth Avenue in Downtown; Forbes Avenue in Downtown; Liberty Avenue in Downtown; Penn Avenue in Downtown
- North end: Fort Duquesne Boulevard in Downtown

Stanwix Street is a street nearly half a mile long near The Point in Downtown Pittsburgh. Running south from the Allegheny River to the Monongahela River, it is the western terminus of Forbes Avenue, and intersects 8 other streets. On it sits PPG Place and Fifth Avenue Place, the 3rd and 4th tallest buildings in Pittsburgh.

== History ==
Stanwix Street consists of the former Fifth Street (originally called Pitt Street) and the former Ferry Street, to the respective north and south of Liberty Avenue. Both of those former streets date back to the original town plan of 1784. Fifth Street was renamed Stanwix Street in 1910 in honor of British General John Stanwix, who led the construction of Fort Pitt. Stanwix Street was extended southward by incorporating Ferry Street in 1955.

The Great Fire of Pittsburgh of April 10, 1845, began on Ferry Street, which is now the southern portion of Stanwix Street.
