= Fifth Avenue (Pittsburgh) =

Street in Pittsburgh, Pennsylvania

Coordinates: 40.4479016°N 79.9363574°W

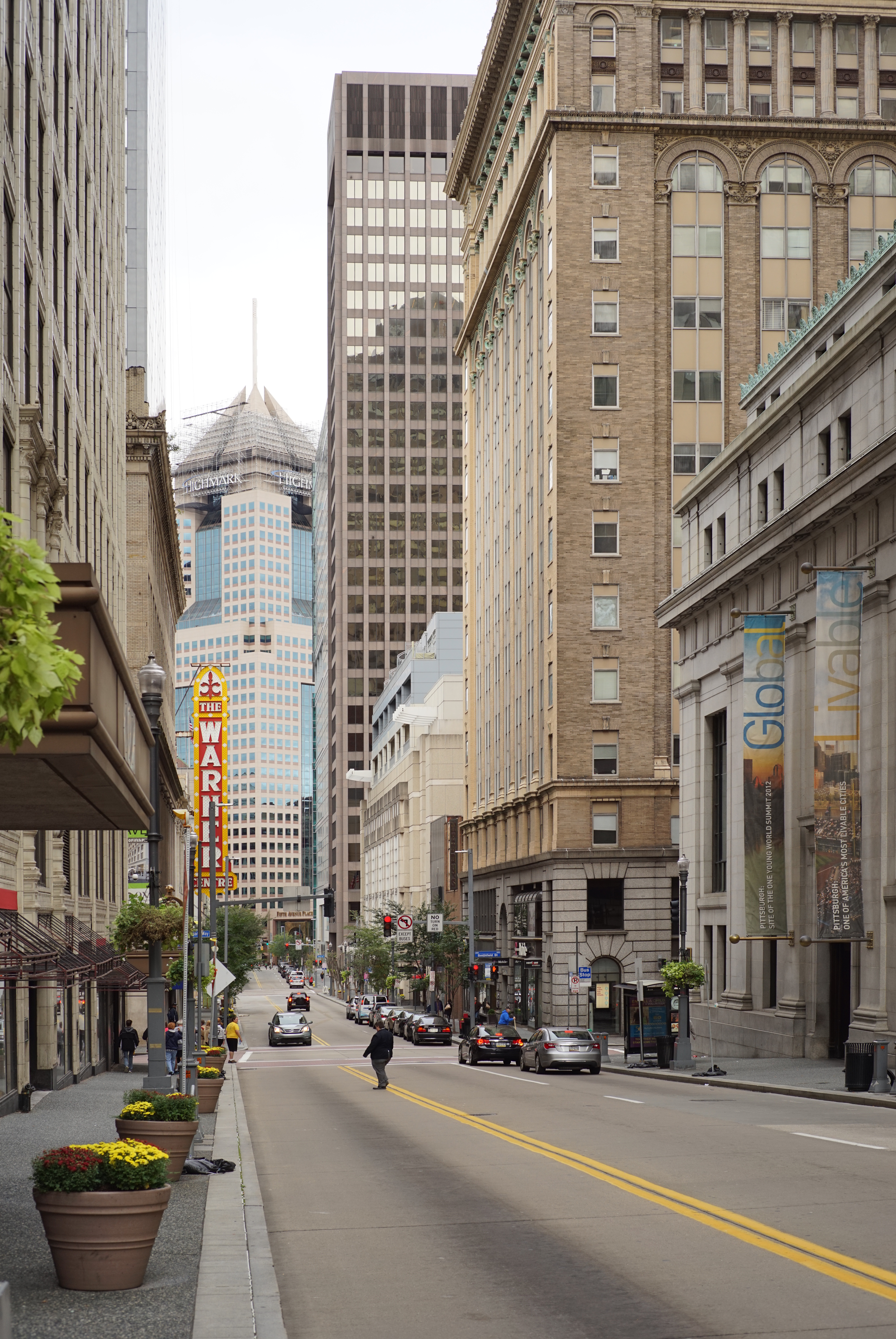
- Downtown Pittsburgh on Fifth Avenue
- Interactive map of Fifth Avenue
- Length: 5 mi (8.0 km)
- Component highways: PA 8 between Penn Avenue and Frankstown Avenue
- Location: Pittsburgh, Pennsylvania
- West end: Penn Avenue in Downtown
- Major junctions: Liberty Avenue in Downtown; Grant Street in Downtown; PA 8 (Penn Avenue) in Point Breeze
- East end: PA 8 Washington Blvd/Frankstown Ave in Homewood
- North: Oliver Avenue
- South: Forbes Avenue

Fifth Avenue (sometimes spelled 5th Avenue) is one of the longest streets in Pittsburgh, Pennsylvania, United States. It begins downtown and moves eastward for over five miles (9 km). Fifth Avenue passes by the Carlow University, the Cathedral of Learning and other buildings of the University of Pittsburgh, then forms the borders between Shadyside on the north and Squirrel Hill and Point Breeze to the south. Finally, after passing Chatham University, The Ellis School, and Mellon Park, it turns north and forms the border between Larimer on the west and North Point Breeze and Homewood (Pittsburgh) on the east. At the intersection with Frankstown Avenue its name becomes Washington Boulevard (PA 8) and descends a branch of Negley Run to meet Allegheny River Boulevard (PA 130) near the Highland Park Bridge.

At least 30 streets either cross or intersect with Fifth Avenue, including Penn Avenue, which intersects it twice (once in Downtown and again near Point Breeze). Forbes Avenue parallels it from Downtown through Uptown and Oakland before diverging at the University of Pittsburgh; they form a one-way pair through Uptown and Oakland (Forbes from Downtown toward Oakland, Fifth from Oakland toward Downtown).

== Photographs ==
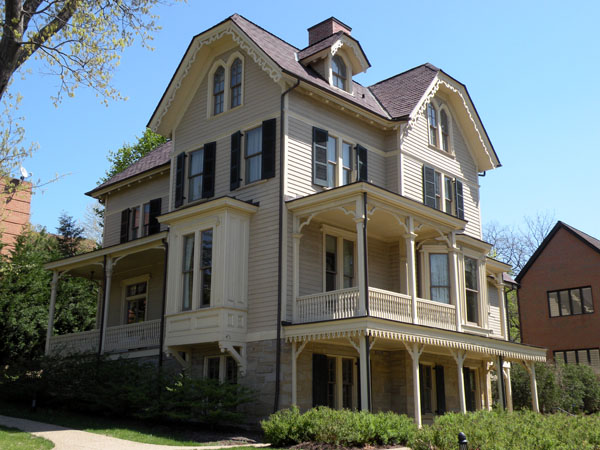
Howe-Childs Gate House, built around 1861 by Thomas Marshall Howe, at 5918 Fifth Avenue.

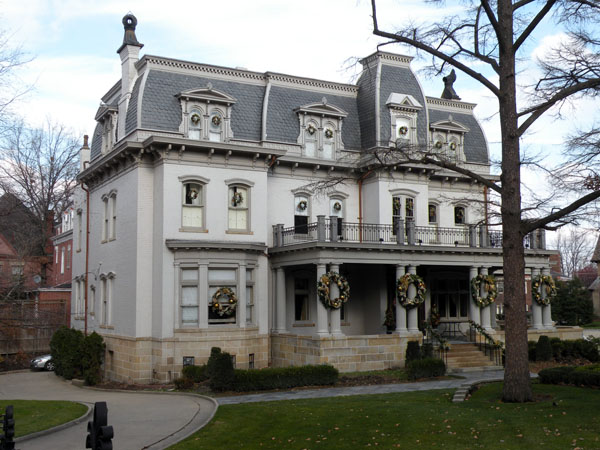
Negley-Gwinner-Harter House, built in 1870 and 1871, at 5061 Fifth Avenue.

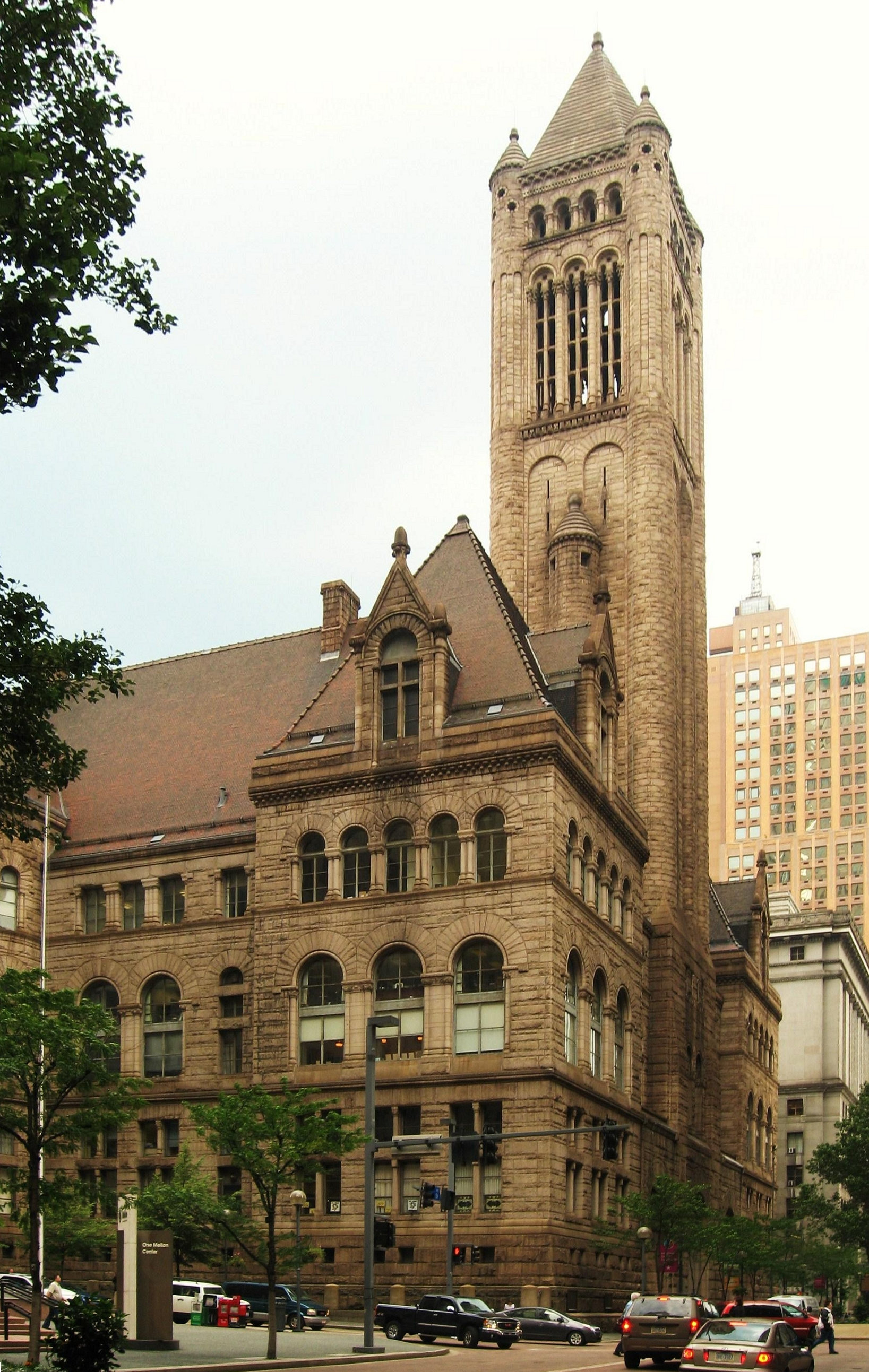
Allegheny County Courthouse, built in 1884, bounded by Fifth and Forbes Avenues, as well as Grant and Ross Streets.

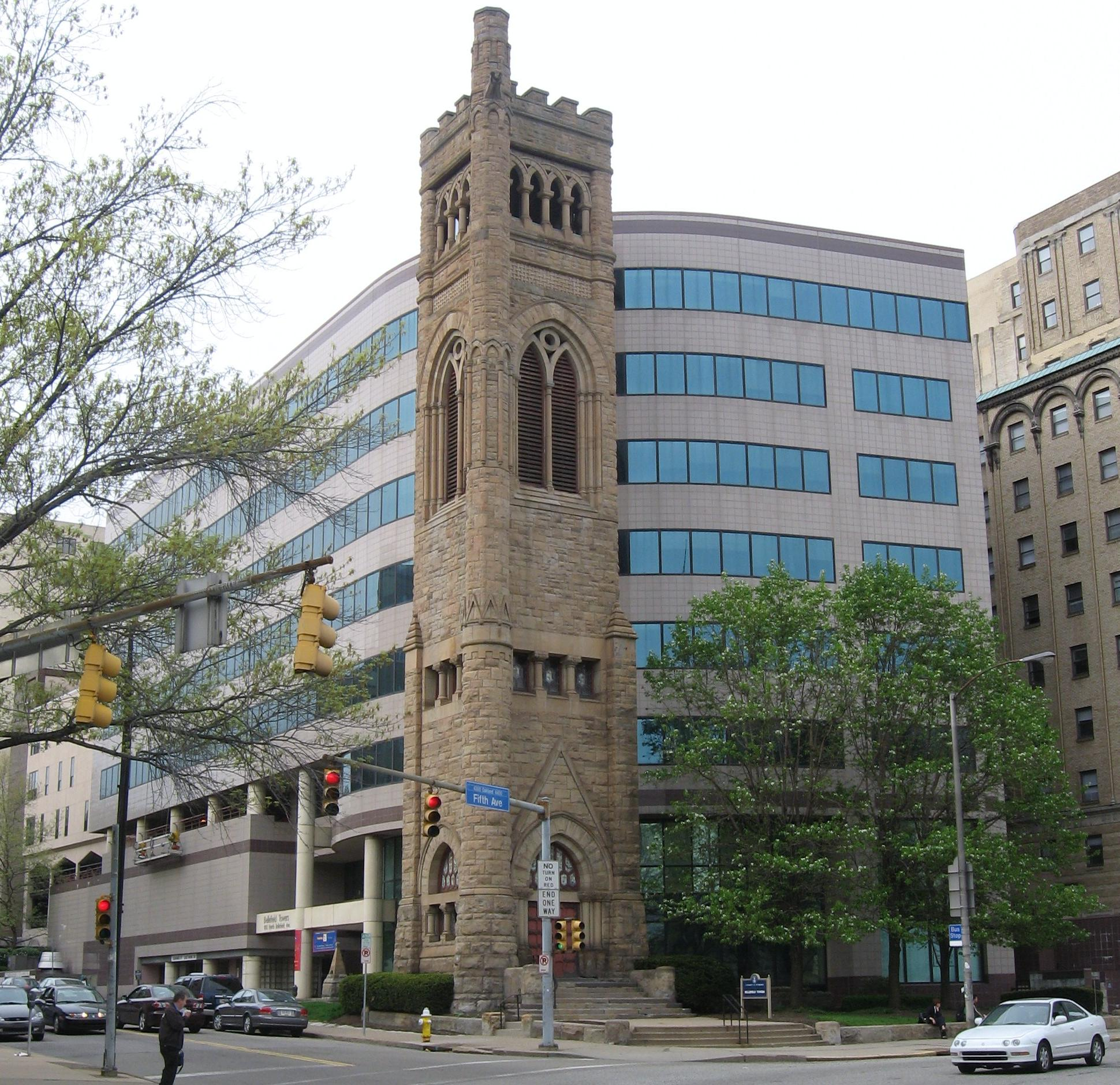
The 1889 bell tower from the former Bellefield Presbyterian Church is all that remains in front of the University of Pittsburgh's Bellefield Towers building at the corner of Fifth and Bellefield Avenues.

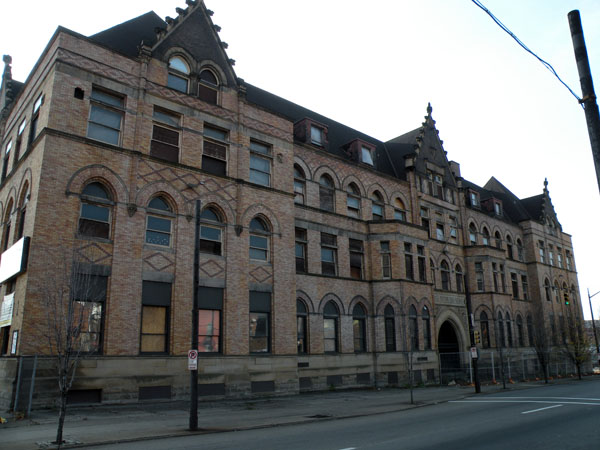
Fifth Avenue High School, built in 1894, at 1800 5th Avenue.

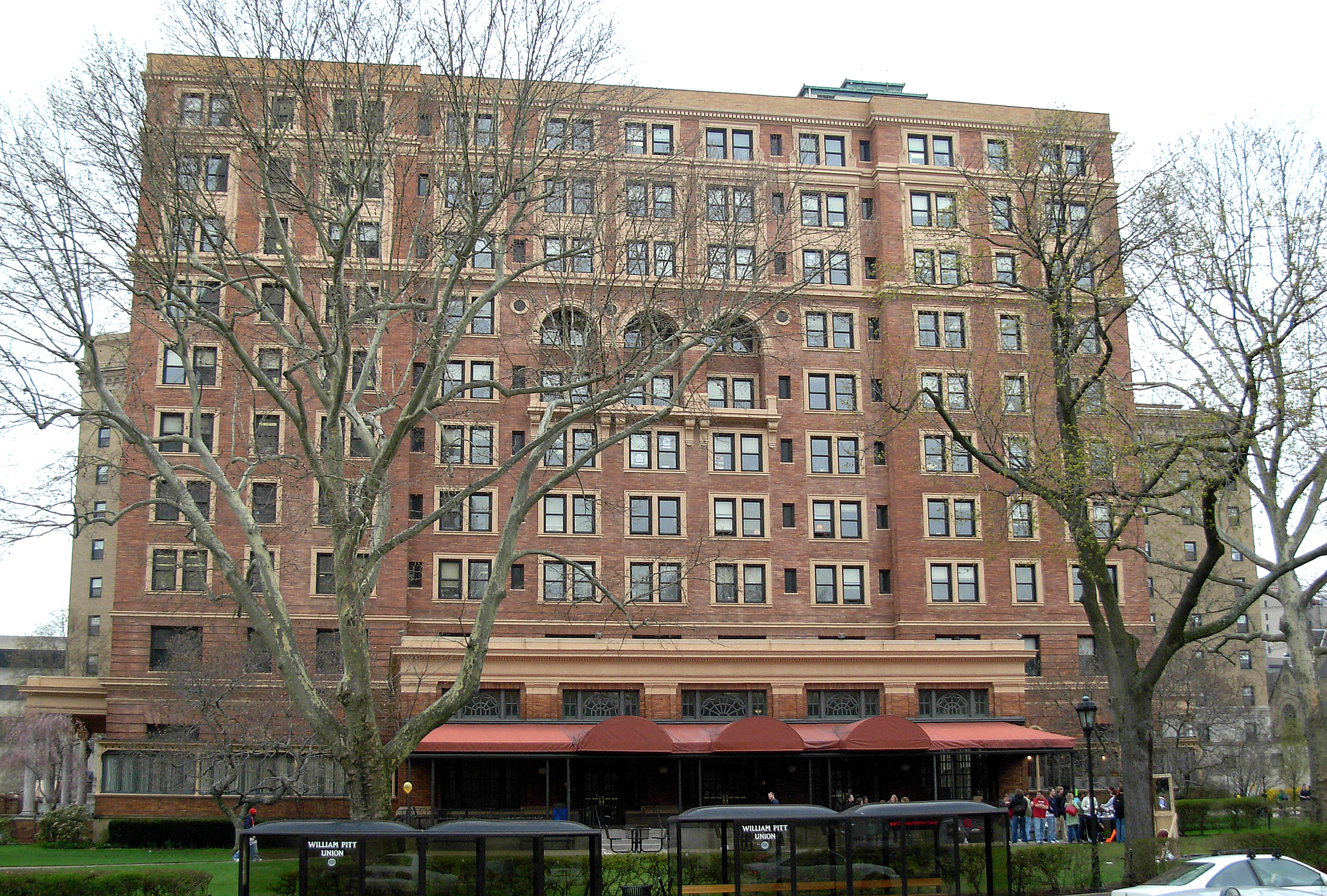
William Pitt Union, the student building of the University of Pittsburgh, built in 1898, bounded by Fifth Avenue, Bigelow Boulevard, and Forbes Avenue.

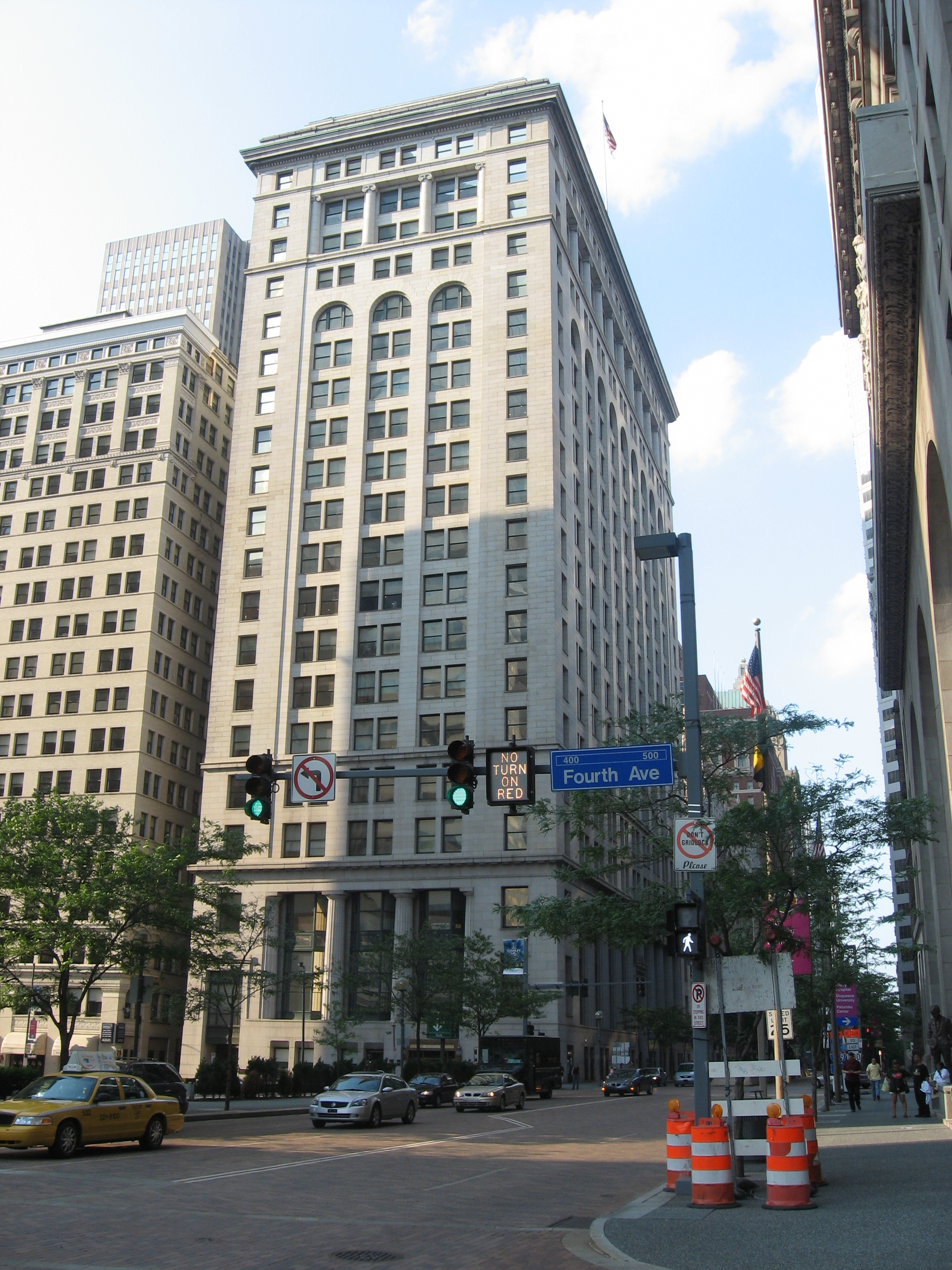
Frick Building, built in 1902, at Grant Street and Fifth Avenue.

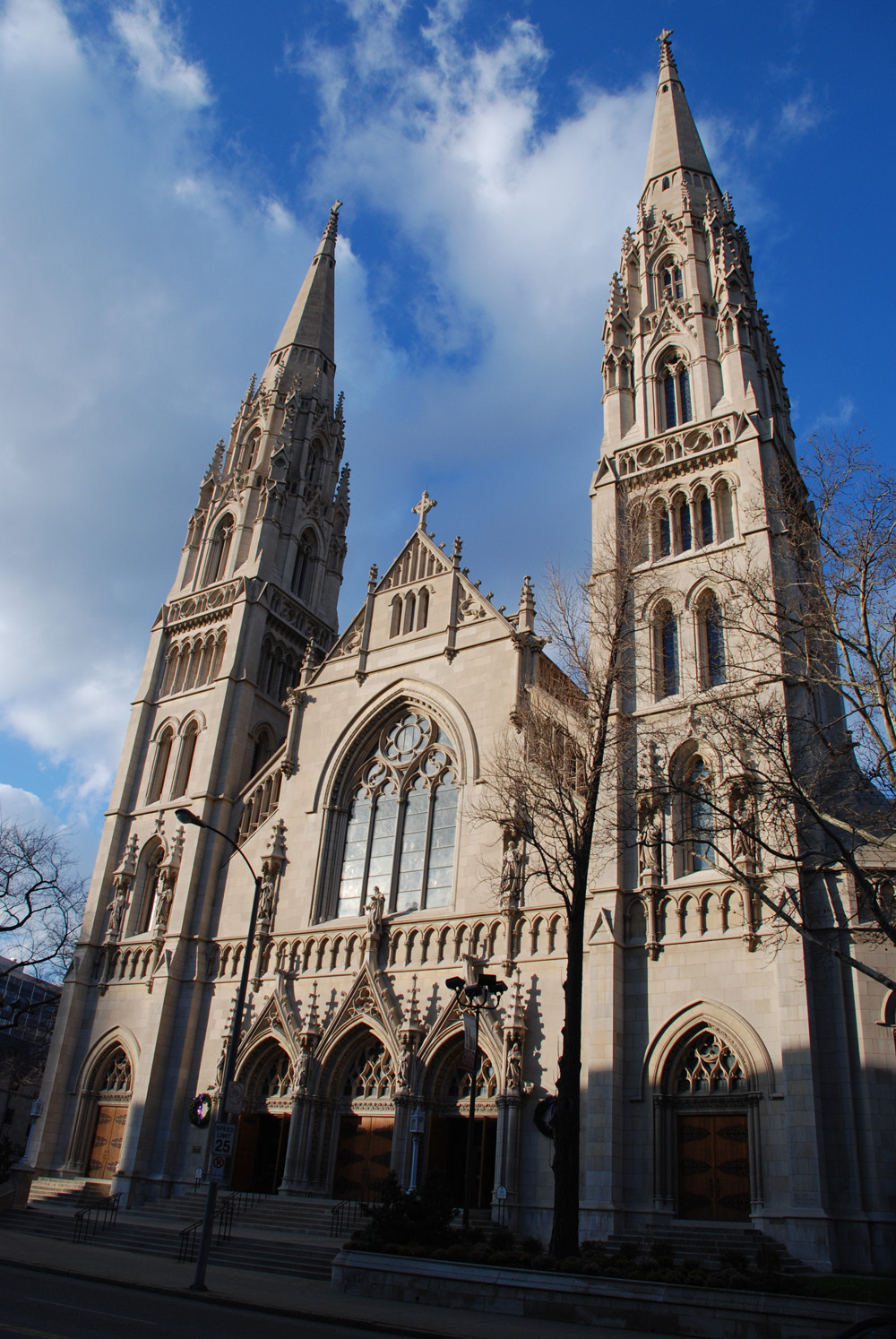
Cathedral of Saint Paul in Pittsburgh, completed in 1906, at the corner of 5th Avenue and N. Craig Street.

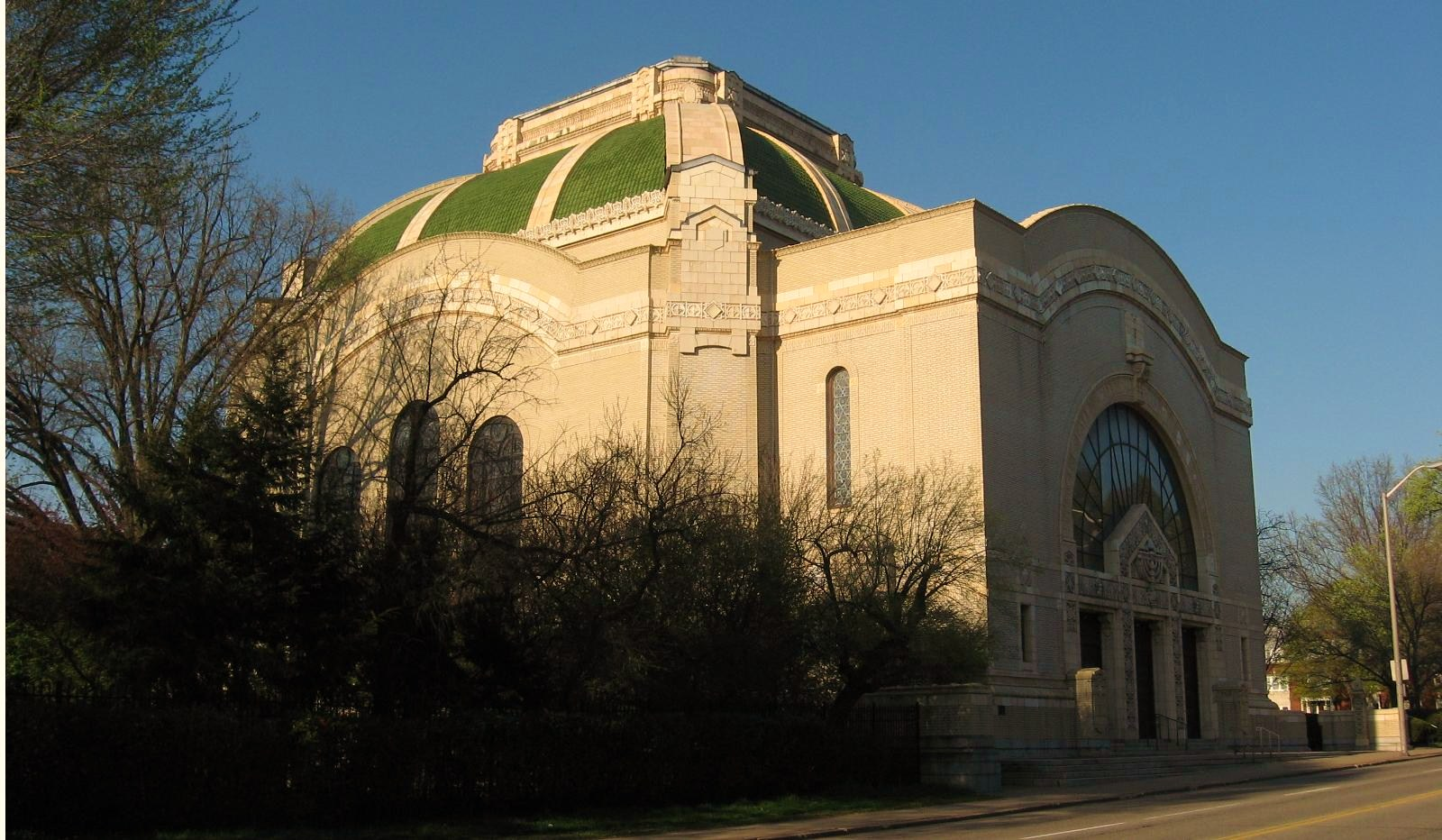
Rodef Shalom, built in 1906, at 4905 5th Avenue.

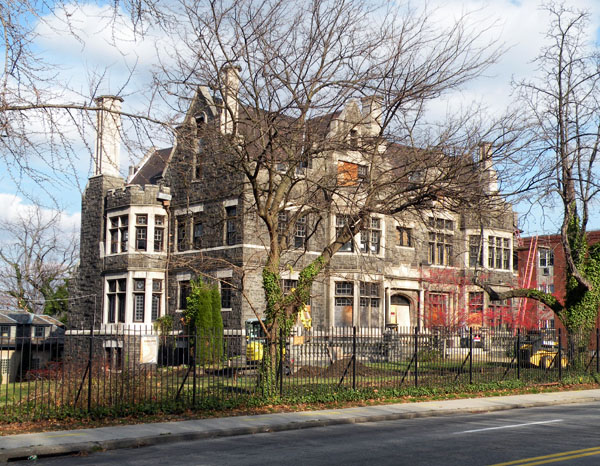
Willis McCook House, built in 1906 and 1907, at 5105 Fifth Avenue.

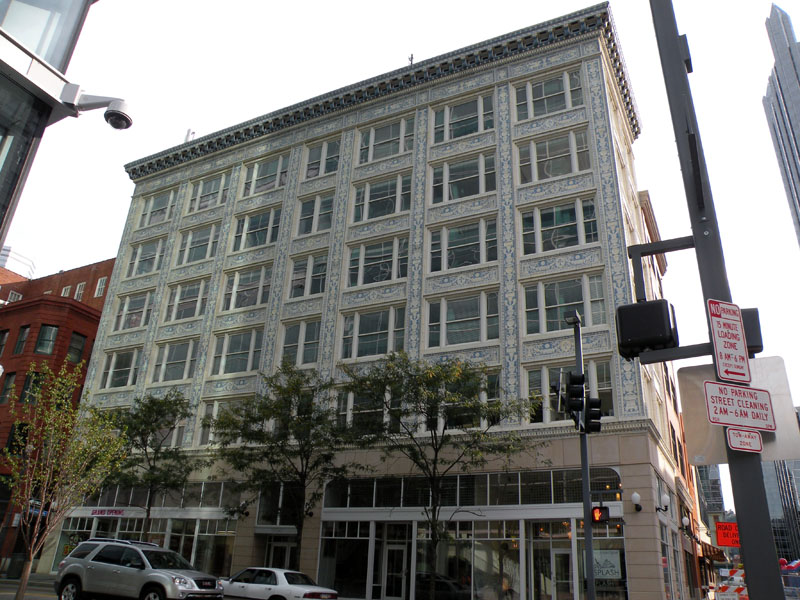
Buhl Building, built in 1913, at 204 5th Avenue.

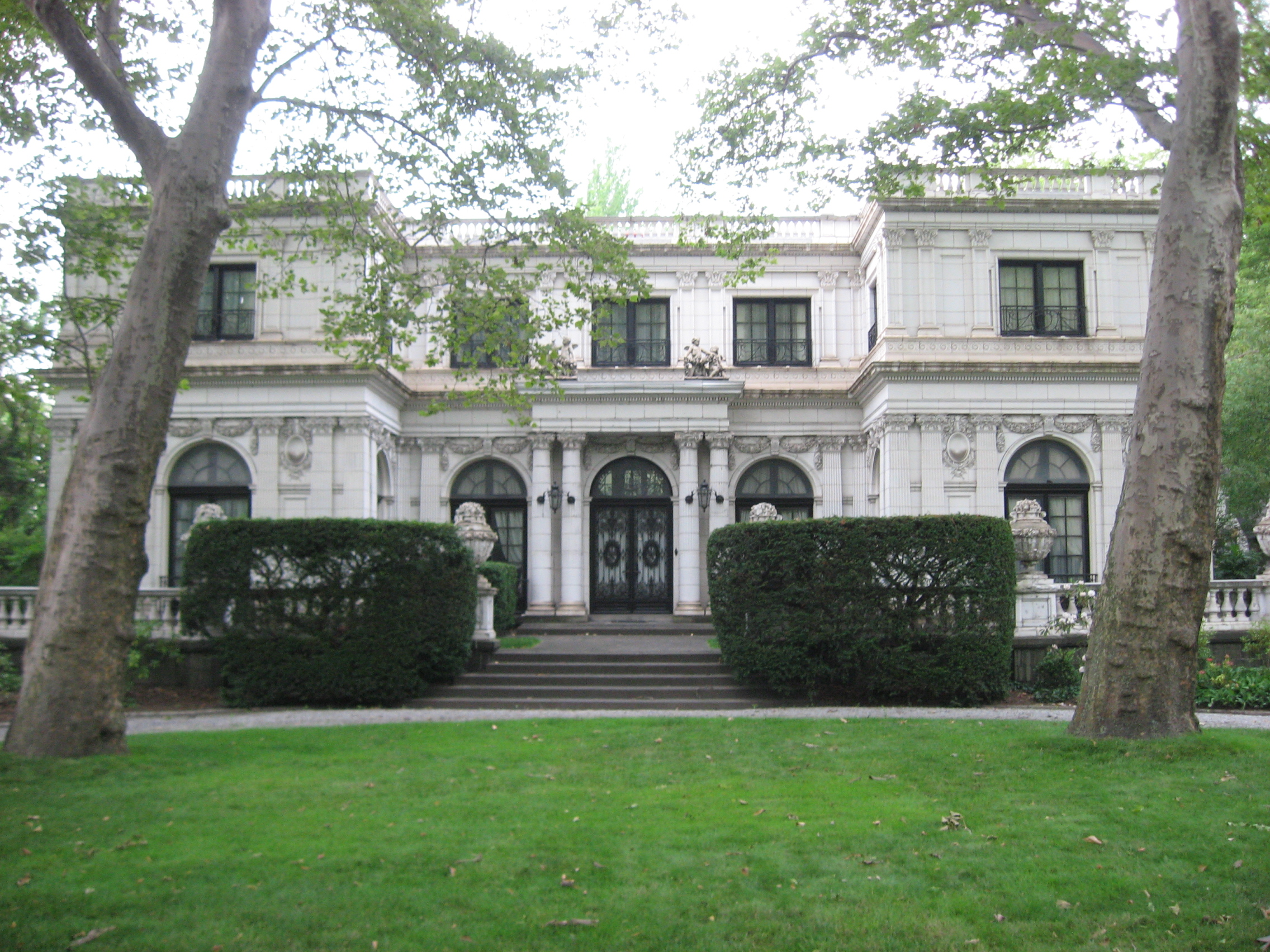
Moreland-Hoffstot House, built in 1914, at 5057 5th Avenue.

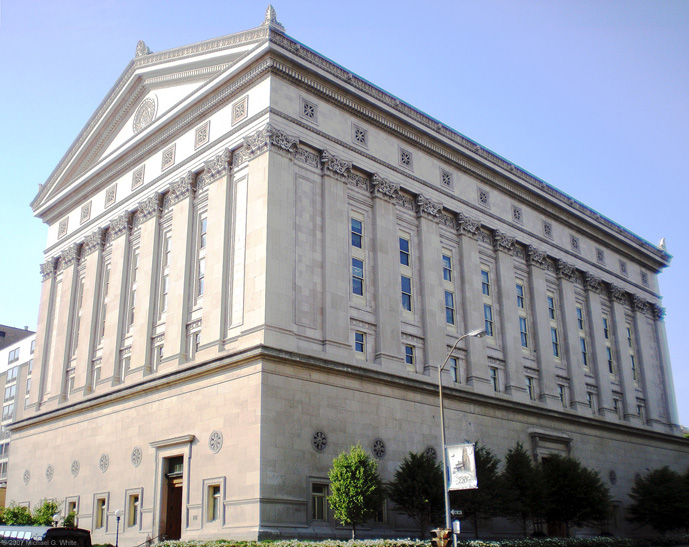
Alumni Hall of the University of Pittsburgh, built in 1915, at Fifth and Lytton Avenues.

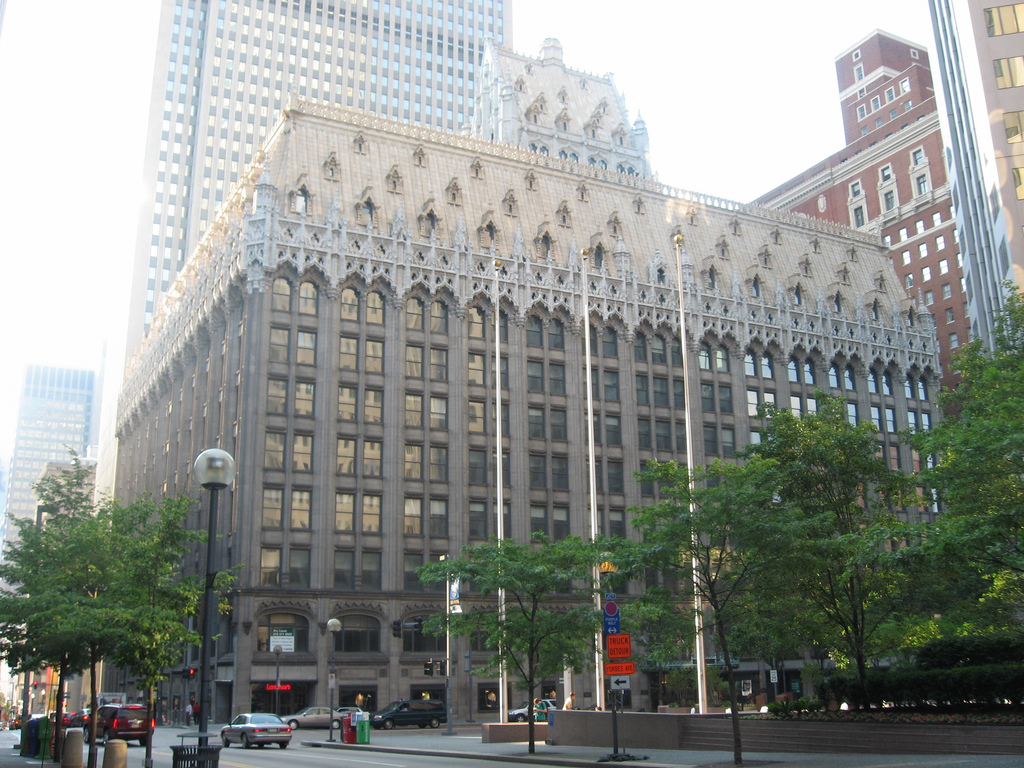
Union Trust Building, built in 1917, at the corner of Fifth Avenue and Grant Street (501 Grant Street).

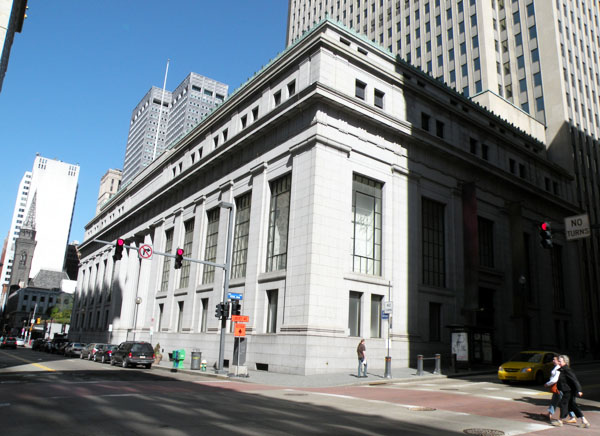
Former Mellon National Bank Building (later, briefly, Lord & Taylor Department Store), built from 1923 to 1924, located at the corner of Fifth Avenue and Smithfield Street (514 Smithfield Street).

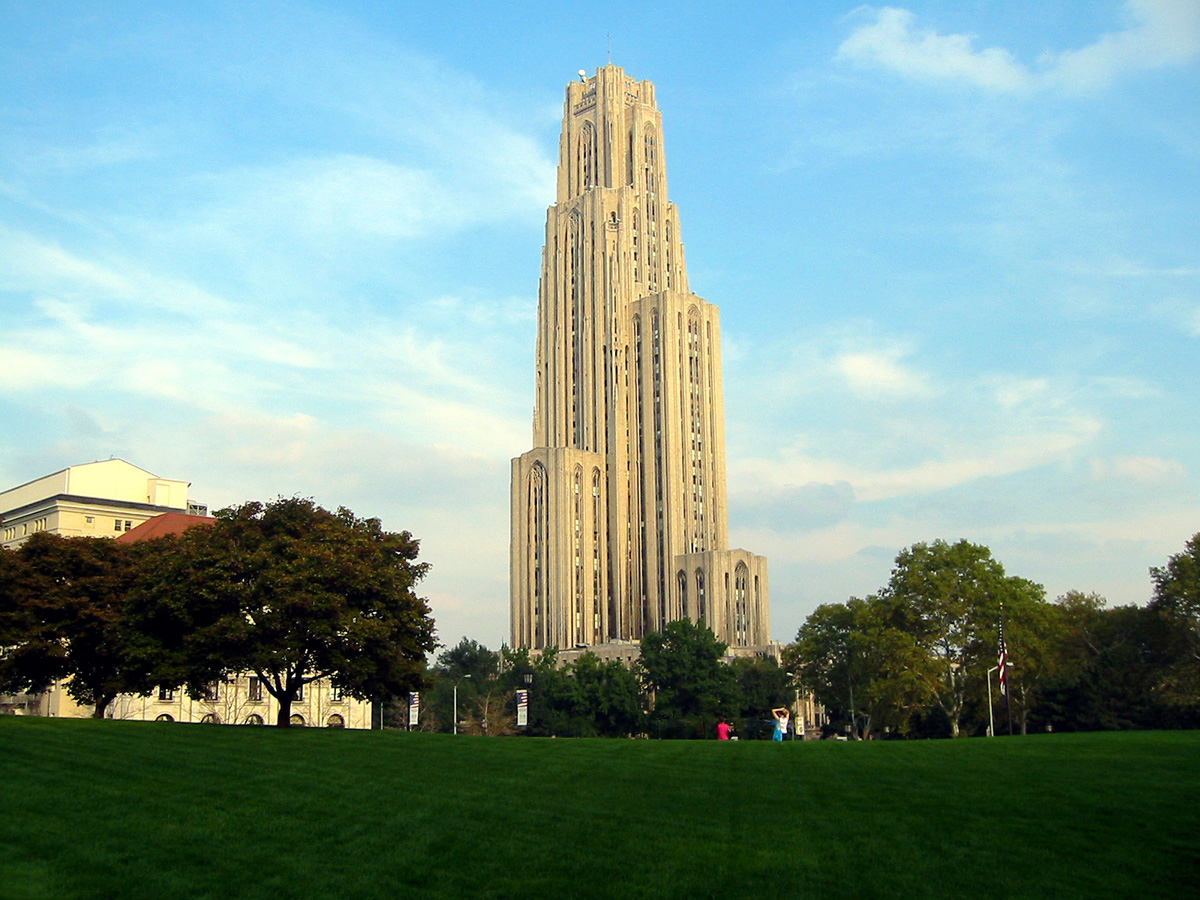
Cathedral of Learning, built in 1926, bounded by Fifth, Forbes, and S. Bellefield Avenues and Bigelow Boulevard.

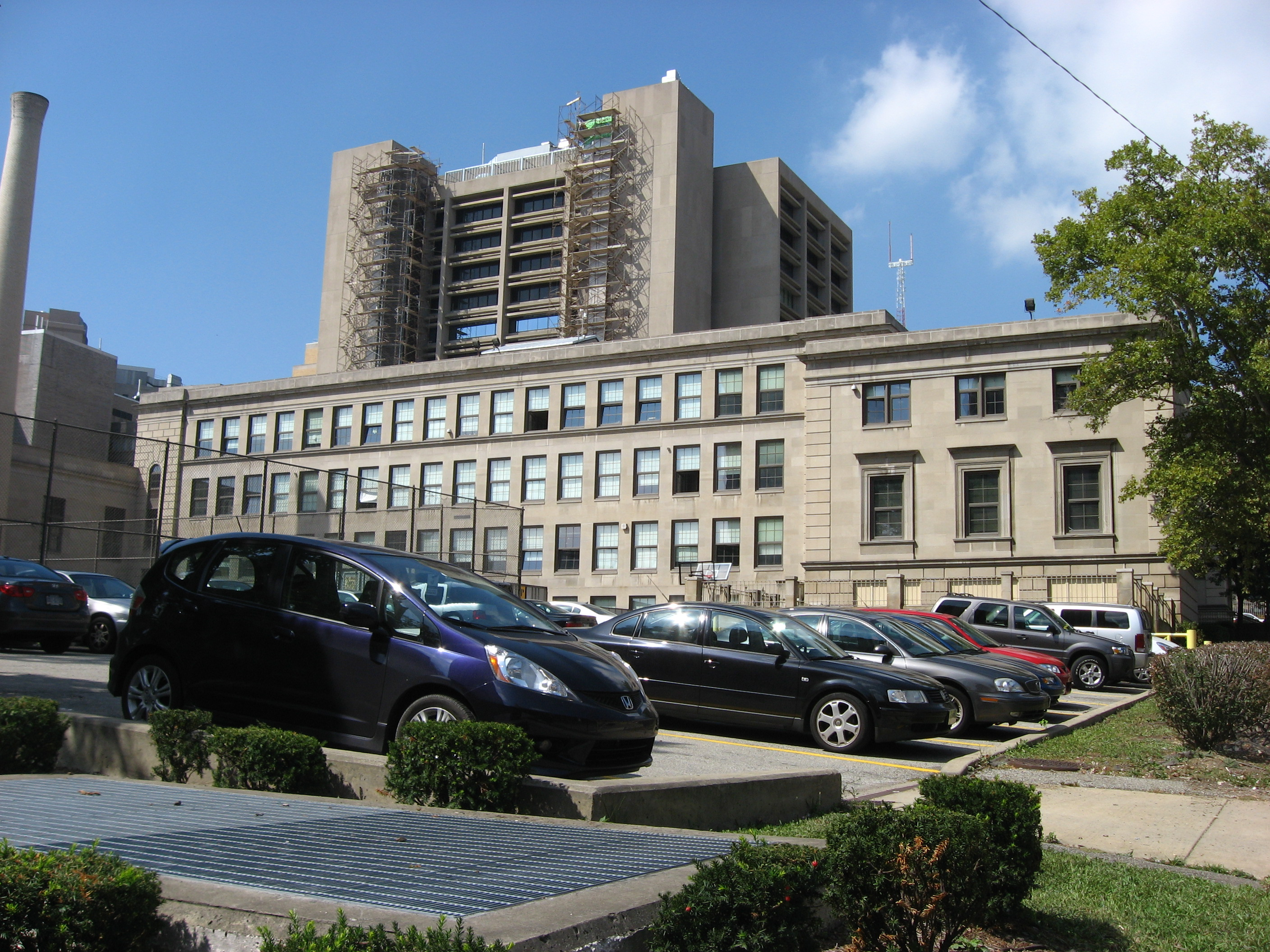
Pittsburgh Science and Technology Academy, built in 1927, at Thackeray Street and Fifth Avenue.

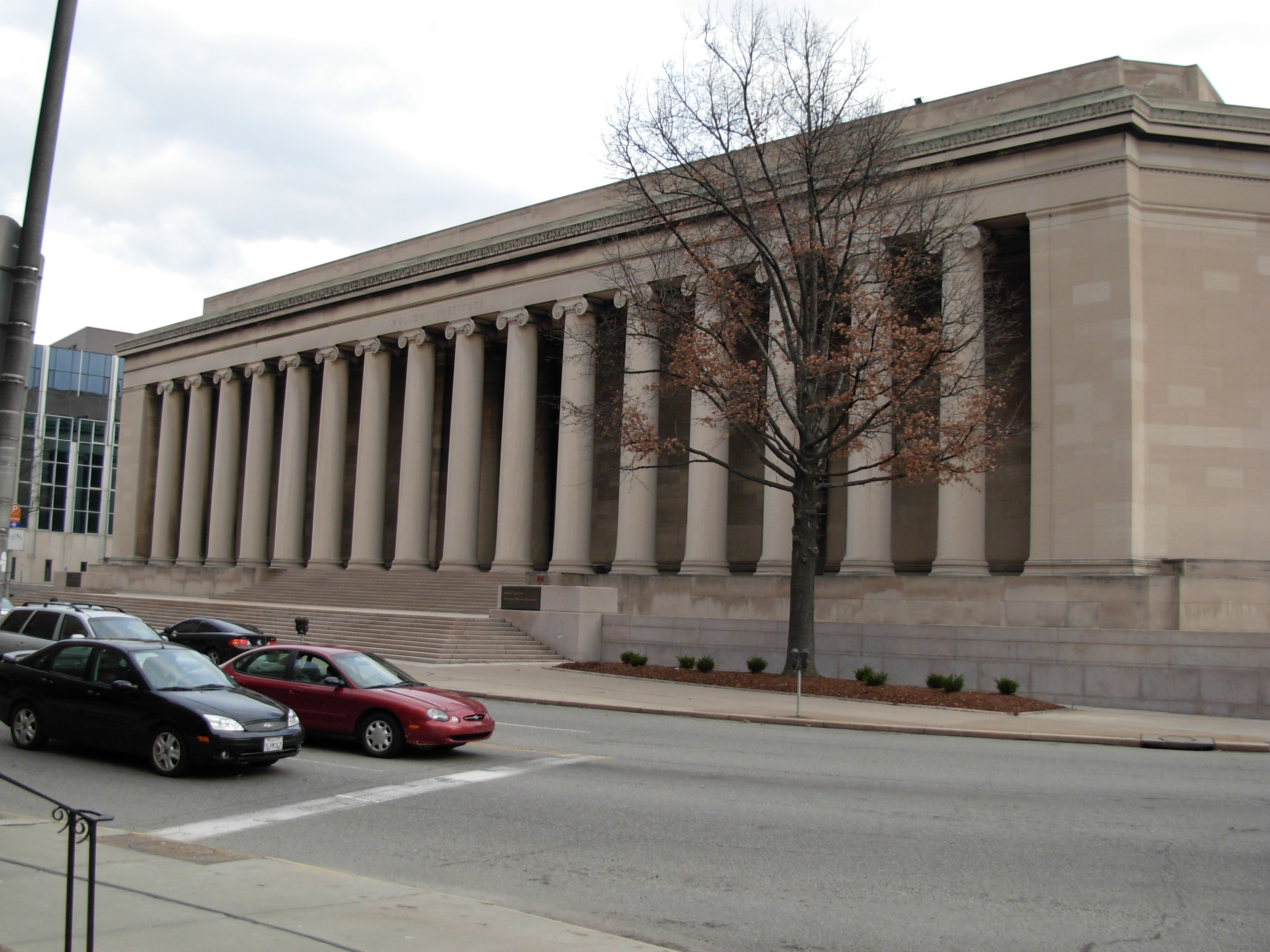
Mellon Institute of Industrial Research of Carnegie Mellon University, built in 1937, at the corner of Fifth Avenue and S. Bellefield Avenue.

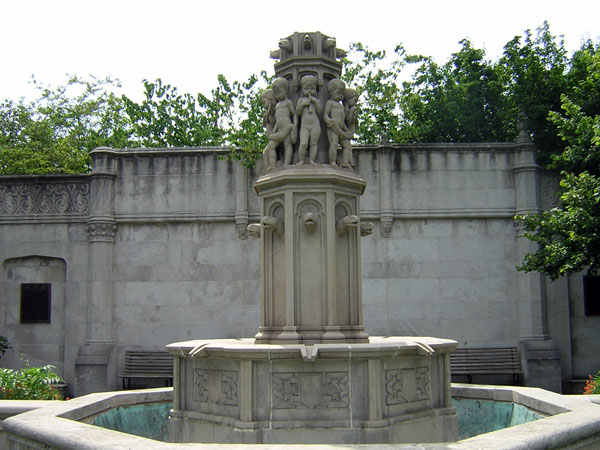
Mellon Park, established 1943 (gardens designed in 1912), at the corner of Fifth and Shady Avenues in Point Breeze.

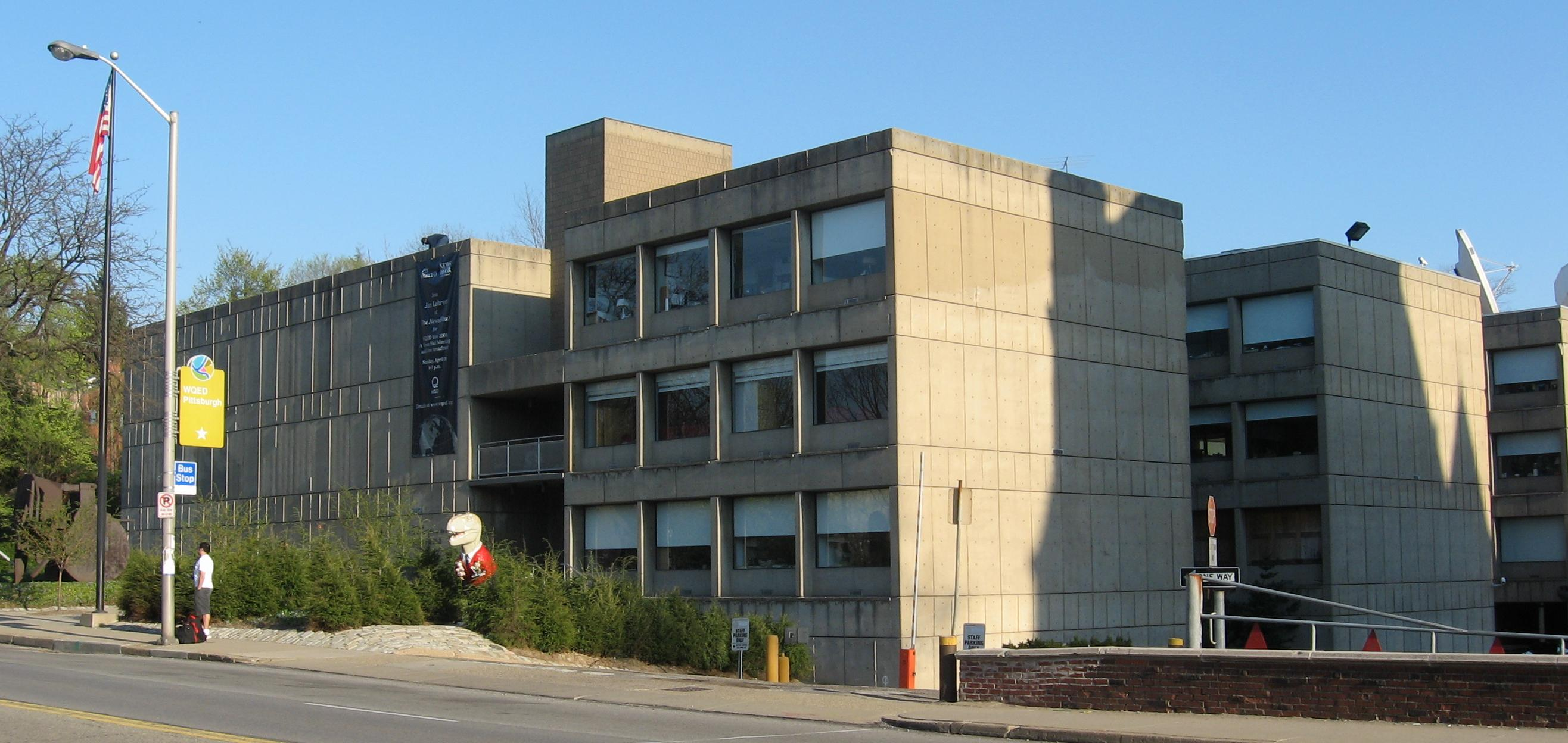
WQED's headquarters on Fifth Avenue, opened in 1954, the first public television station in the United States.

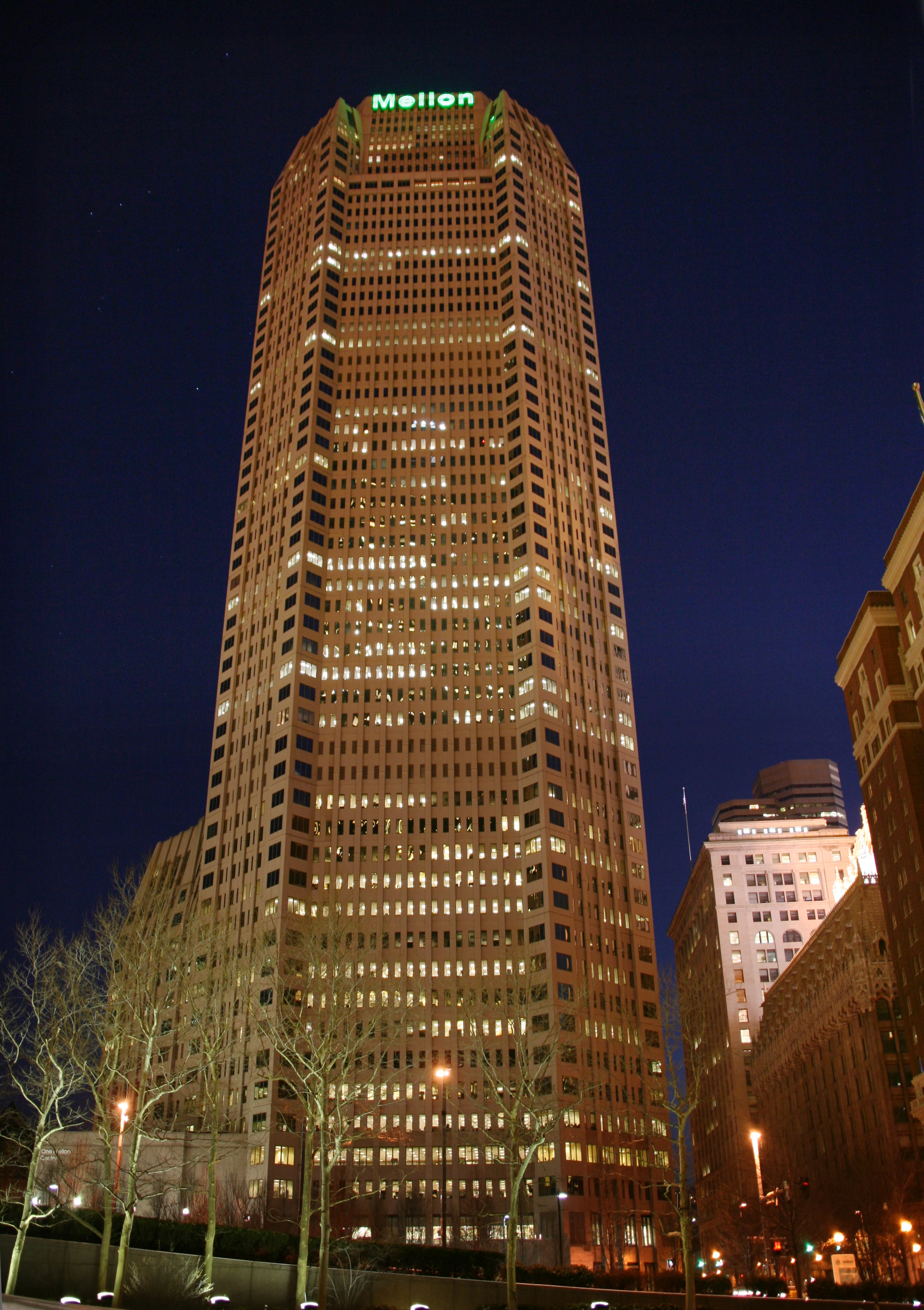
BNY Mellon Center, built in 1983, at the corner of Fifth Avenue and Grant Street (500 Grant Street).

== Major junctions ==
The entire route is in Pittsburgh, Allegheny County.

mi	km	Destinations	Notes
		Penn Avenue / Cecil Place	Western terminus
		Liberty Avenue	
		Graeme Street - Market Square	
		Purple Belt (Grant Street)	
		Sixth Avenue	Transition from one-way westbound street with eastbound bus lane to two-way street
		Diamond Street – Tenth Street Bridge, South Side	
		Chatham Square / Washington Place to PA 380 (Bigelow Boulevard) – East End	
		Pride Street – UPMC Mercy	
		Birmingham Bridge / Kirkpatrick Street to PA 837 – South Side	
		PA 885 west (Boulevard of the Allies) to I-376 west	Exit ramp; no access to PA 885 east or from PA 885
		Craft Avenue east to I-376 / I-579 – Monroeville	
		Halket Street – UPMC Magee-Womens Hospital	
		Oakland Avenue / De Soto Street – University of Pittsburgh, UPMC Presbyterian, UPMC Western Psychiatric Hospital	
		Bellefield Avenue	Transition from two-way street to one-way westbound street with eastbound bus lane
		Craig Street to PA 380 (Bigelow Boulevard) – North Side, East End	
		Wilkins Avenue – Squirrel Hill	
		Negley Avenue – Shadyside	
		North Woodland Road / South Highland Avenue – East Liberty	
		Blue Belt (Shady Avenue)	Western end of concurrency with Blue Belt
		PA 8 south / PA 380 (Penn Avenue) – Bakery Square, Homewood, Regent Square, Wilkinsburg	Western end of concurrency with PA 8
		PA 8 north / Blue Belt (Washington Avenue) / Frankstown Avenue – Sharpsburg	Eastern terminus; eastern end of concurrency with PA 8; eastern end of concurrency with Blue Belt
1.000 mi = 1.609 km; 1.000 km = 0.621 mi: Concurrency terminus; Incomplete access
