= Great Fire of Pittsburgh =

Conflagration in 1845

Coordinates: 40.44707°N 79.97549°W

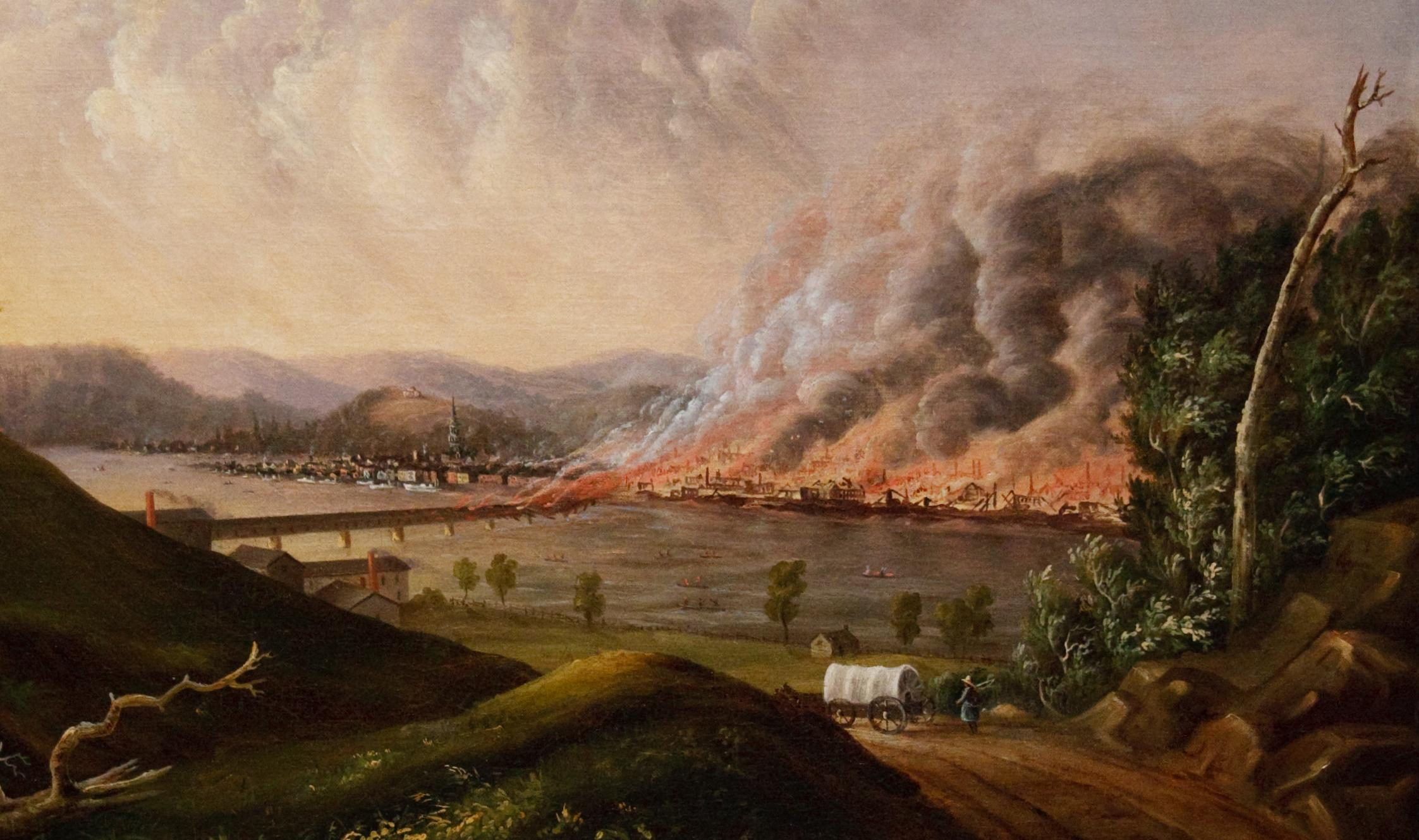
Detail from View of the Great Fire of Pittsburgh, 1846, a painting by witness William Coventry Wall

The Great Fire of Pittsburgh was a conflagration in Pittsburgh which occurred on April 10, 1845. It was sparked by an unattended fire that ignited a nearby ice shed or barn, and spread due to a number of factors, including the poor water pressure the outstripped infrastructure gave to the ill-equipped volunteer fire companies, the mixture of soot, flour dust, and cotton fibers in the air from industry, the frequent near-gale-force winds hitting the city at midday, and the six weeks before the fire that the city had been deprived of rain.

After the fire, the city was shortly rebuilt. Local ministers and the mayor of the neighboring Allegheny City blamed the disaster on the wrath of God. Two people died, and one author estimates around $12 million in damages at the time in 1845 dollars, placing it at $411 million in 2024 dollars. The state legislature agreed to grant the city $50,000 in relief, to refund taxes from destroyed structures, and to give the whole city a three-year reprive from taxes. The market for replacement homes and household articles further spurred the city's industries, and the fire was eventually held to have "spurred the city to greater growth," an attitude encouraged by the Pittsburgh's industrialists.

== Background ==
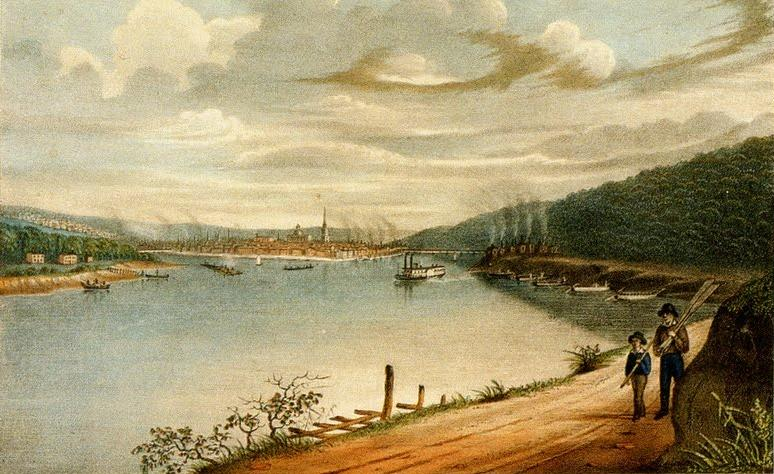
View of Pittsburgh as seen from the Ohio River before the Great Fire, from William Coventry Wall's print, Great Conflagration at Pittsburgh. The pollution that would be a contributing factor is evident.

The city of Pittsburgh originated in the mid-18th century as a French military settlement at the confluence of the Allegheny and Monongahela rivers. It remained relatively small through the end of that century, but the 19th century brought rapid growth of a population made up of natives of English, Scottish, and German descent, as well as large numbers of immigrants. By 1845, its population topped 20,000 and was swelled by crews completing the new Pennsylvania Canal.

The city's growth had been haphazard, resulting in a patchwork of the rich homes and businesses of the city fathers intermingled with tightly packed abutting wooden structures housing its largely-immigrant labor force. Its outstripped infrastructure provided poor water pressure and an insufficient volume to its ten ill-equipped volunteer fire companies, which were more social clubs than effective public service organizations. The year before, the city had completed a new reservoir, but had then closed the old one. However, the water lines and pumpers were inadequate. There were just two water mains for the entire city, and the fire companies had insufficient hose to reach the center of the city from the rivers, most of the existing hose having been condemned.

Iron manufacturing had developed in the city, and had come to represent a quarter of its industrial output. The furnaces driving Pittsburgh's iron and glass industries had filled the air with coal dust and soot, as an 1823 observer reported, coating the walls and leaving the men working in the streets "as black as Satan himself," while the British author Charles Dickens had written in 1842 that the city had a "great quantity of smoke hanging over it." Other industries released flour dust and cotton fibers into the air, contributing to a particularly incendiary mix of dust to settle on the city. In addition, the seasonal weather had deprived the city of rain for six weeks, leaving the reservoir "dangerously low," while frequent near-gale-force winds from the west hit the city at mid-day. These conditions left Pittsburgh primed for the disaster that would strike in 1845.

== Conflagration ==
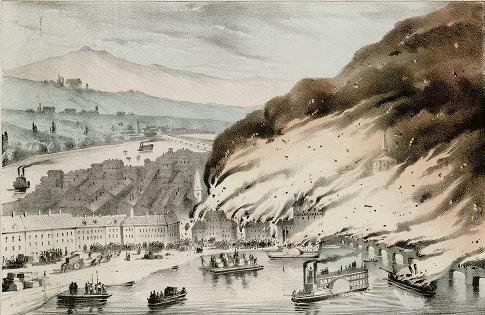
Detail from Nathaniel Currier print, Great Conflagration at Pittsburgh, Pa

The dawn of April 10, 1845, brought a warm, windy day. During a brief interlude in the winds just before noon, Ann Brooks, who worked on Ferry Street for Colonel William Diehl, left unattended a newly stoked fire lit to heat wash water. A spark from this fire ignited a nearby ice shed or barn. The fire companies responded, but got nothing but "a weak, sickly stream of muddy water" from their hoses, and the flames quickly spread to several buildings owned by Colonel Diehl, including his home, and to the Globe Cotton Factory. The bells of the Third Presbyterian Church had given the original alarm, but the church itself was only preserved by dropping its burning wooden cornice into the street. Once saved, its stone walls served as a barrier to the further spread of the fire toward the north and west. Then the wind veered to the southeast and gave the fire added vigor; a witness stated that "the roar of the flames was terrific, and their horrible glare, as they leaped through the dense black clouds of smoke, sweeping earth and sky, was appalling."

By 2:00 pm, with the fire throwing embers into the air that then started new fires where they landed, many of the citizens who had been fighting the flames instead fled to save their own possessions. During its height, between 2:00 and 4:00, the fire marched block by block through the intermixed structures of Pittsburgh's poor and elite, residences and businesses, with "the loftiest buildings melting before the ocean of flame," which consumed wood, melted metal and glass, and collapsed stone and brick. The Bank of Pittsburgh, thought to be fireproof, fell victim when the heat of the fire shattered the windows and melted the zinc roof, the molten metal igniting the wooden interior and burning all except the contents of the vault. A similar fate met the grand Monongahela House, called the "finest Hotel in the west," when its cupola caught fire and collapsed within, resulting in a total loss. The mayor's offices and churches fell. As it spread up Second Street to Market Street it destroyed the region where the city's physicians had been concentrated.

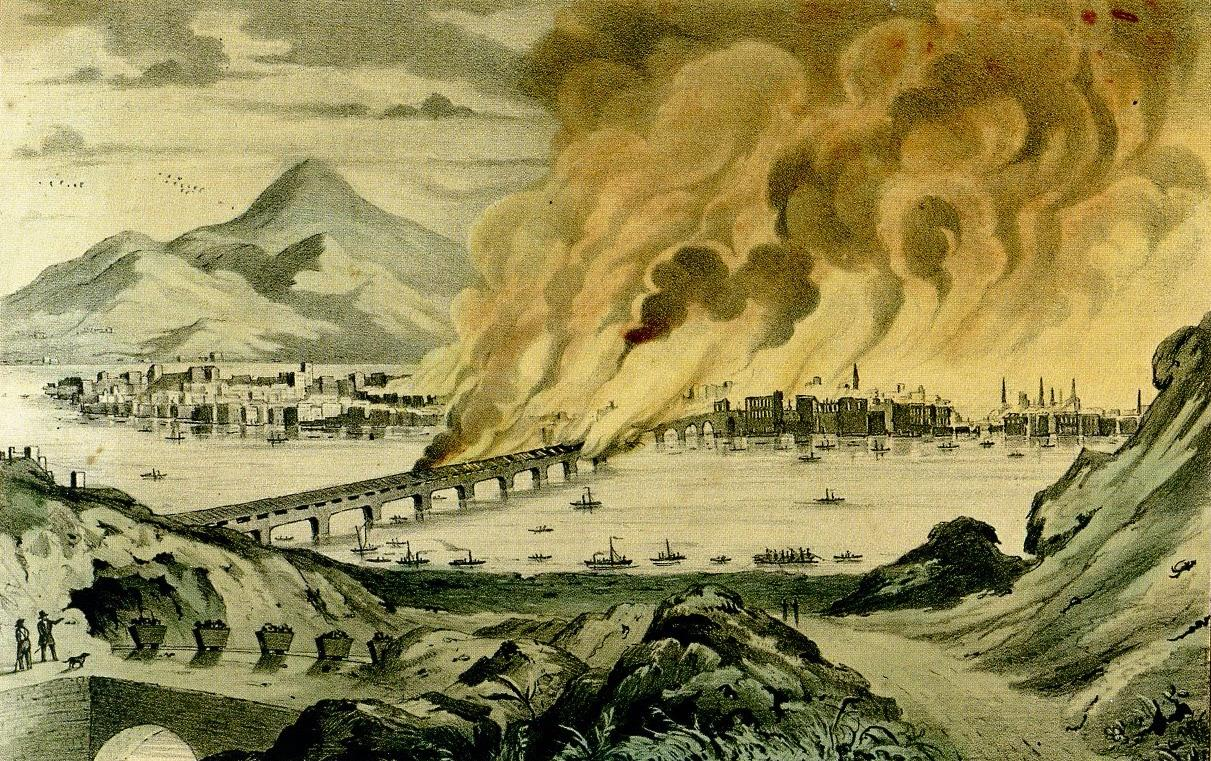
Detail from an 1845 James Baillie print Great Conflagration at Pittsburgh, Pa

Although the flames were intense, they moved slowly enough that residents had time to remove themselves and many of their belongings. Some fled to the highlands to the east (the modern Hill District), then undeveloped except for the newly built courthouse, an area which remained untouched by the flames. Of those who fled south to the Monongahela River, some were able to cross the Monongahela Bridge (located at the site of the present Smithfield Street Bridge), which connected the city to the southern bank of the river and was the first of what would be many bridges spanning Pittsburgh's rivers. However, this soon became congested, and then the wood-covered structure ignited, being fully consumed in about 15 minutes and leaving nothing but its supporting pylons. Those counting on riverboats to take their belongings away fared less well because the boats that did not flee burned, leaving the refugees to pile their belongings on the riverbank. Most of this material was burned by the advancing flames, stolen or looted, while the escaping population was typically left with nothing more than they could carry. The docks and warehouses on the waterfront were likewise consumed, and as with the residences, attempts to save materials from the warehouses by bringing them to the riverbank only delayed their destruction. The fire followed the river into Pipetown, an area of workers' housing and factories, again spreading destruction. It only halted when the winds died down about 6:00, and by 7:00 it had fully abated within the city, having burned its way to the river and cooler hills. The factories of Pipetown burned on until about 9:00. Throughout the night, there were occasional flare-ups along with the repeated sounds of buildings collapsing.

== Fighting the fire ==
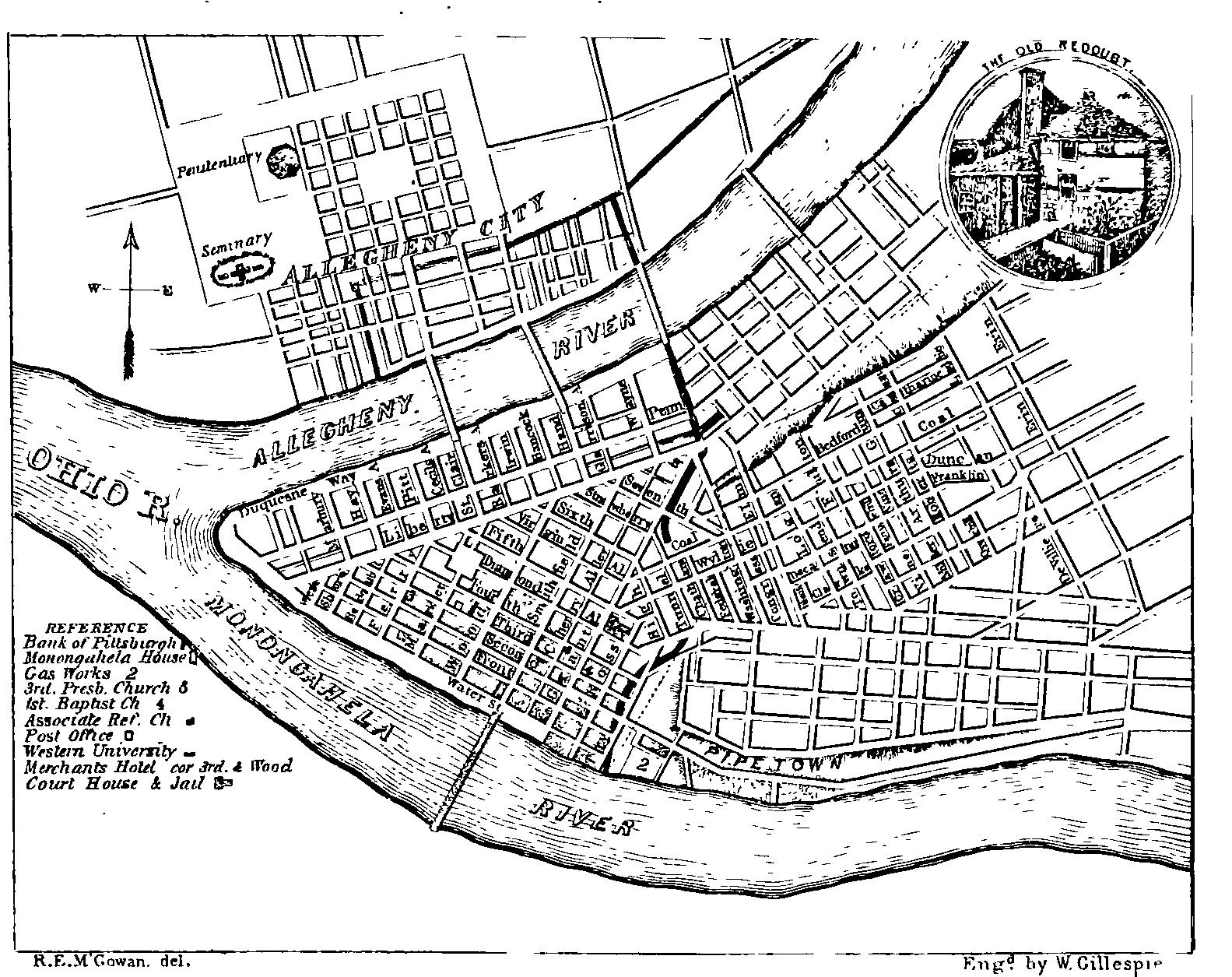
Map of Pittsburgh and vicinity, 1845, from Foster, A Full Account of The Great Fire at Pittsburgh

The burgeoning fire companies of the city found themselves overwhelmed. In a city flanked by rivers, their equipment and infrastructure were insufficient to bring water to the site of the blaze. The volunteer companies, which functioned more as gentlemen's clubs than professional firefighting organizations, lost most of their hoses and two of their engines in the blaze.

Help also came from individual volunteers. While the vessels on the Monongahela fled the city, those on the Allegheny side, to the north, were active in ferrying refugees across the river and bringing back men from Allegheny City to help fight the flames and evacuate residents. Among those crossing to help was a young Stephen Foster, who would later become known as the 'father of American music'.

More help was brought from the "Neptune Volunteer Fire Brigade" which had its headquarters on Seventh Avenue, Pittsburgh. The volunteer force was led by John C. Wallacker who contracted asthma from the fire of which he eventually died.

Congregation members rushed to save the Third Presbyterian Church. The thirteen-year-old John R. Banks went to the roof of the Western University of Pennsylvania (forerunner of the University of Pittsburgh) in an attempt to prevent it from being ignited by the falling cinders. However, as described by a witness, "the cupola of the University burnt for a few minutes like paper and went down." The home of the university president was also lost. Others went into the evacuating areas to loot the abandoned homes and goods left in the streets. One hotel was saved within the burned area by using gunpowder to blow up the adjacent structures, creating a gap that the flames did not cross.

== Aftermath ==
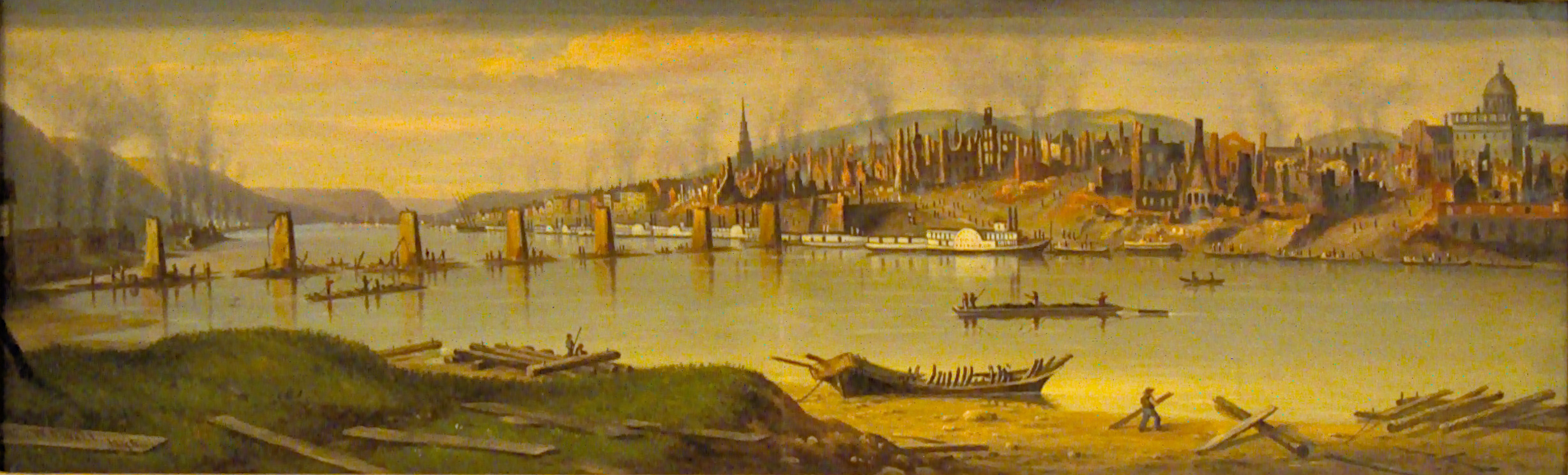
Pittsburgh After the Great Fire, by William Coventry Wall, the painting which served as the basis for his print

By the morning of April 11, a third of the city was burned to the ground, leaving only scattered chimneys and walls amid the ruins, although occasional buildings were inexplicably left untouched amid the destruction. It was said that "the best half of the city" had been burned, an area representing 60 acres, and the entire Second Ward of the city had just two or three dwellings untouched. Local artist William Coventry Wall captured this landscape in a series of paintings which he quickly had printed as a lithograph. This was published in Philadelphia and saw a broad market, as did prints by Nathaniel Currier in Boston and James Baillie in New York (both of whom based their works on newspaper reports), in line with a growing market for "disaster prints." The fire destroyed as many as 1200 buildings, while displacing 2000 families, or about 12,000 individuals, from their homes. Household belongings were piled on the hills surrounding the city. Surprisingly, only two people died. One was lawyer Samuel Kingston, who was thought to have returned to his house to rescue a piano but apparently lost his bearings in the heat and smoke, his body was found in the basement of a neighbour's destroyed house. The other body was not found until weeks later, and is thought to be that of a Mrs. Maglone, whose family had advertised not having seen her since the fire. Estimates of the cost range from $5 to $25 million, with one recent author placing it at $12,000,000, which he equated to $267 million in 2006 dollars. Almost none of this was recoverable, as all but one of Pittsburgh's insurers were bankrupted by the disaster.

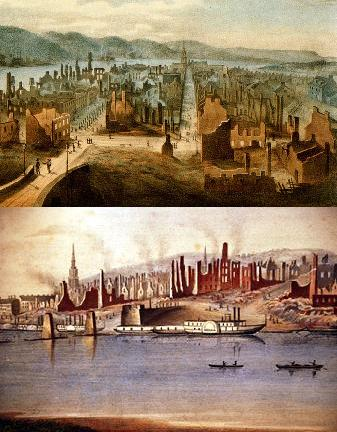
Views of Pittsburgh the day after the Great Fire. Detail from William Coventry Wall's print, Great Conflagration at Pittsburgh.

Local ministers declared the disaster to be the judgment of God upon the iniquities of the industrial city and the mayor of neighboring Allegheny City called for fasting, humiliation and prayer. The mayor and attorney Wilson McCandless personally traveled to the state capital of Harrisburg to appeal for relief, and their petition was supported by Governor Francis R. Shunk. The Legislature agreed to grant the city $50,000, to refund taxes for destroyed structures, and to give the entire city a three-year break from taxes. The latter had an unanticipated disadvantage, forcing public schools to remain closed for want of funding, while the Legislature subsequently made attempts to renege on some of the relief money they had granted. Public and private donations totaling almost $200,000 were received from as far away as Louisiana and even Europe, while several cities and towns in the United States, such as Wheeling and Meadville, Pennsylvania, made donations of commodities such as flour, bacon, potatoes and sauerkraut. The moneys were distributed on a sliding scale to those making claims, the last being disbursed the following July.

The first response of the city was one of despair, as can be seen in reports to newspapers in other cities and in initial descriptions:

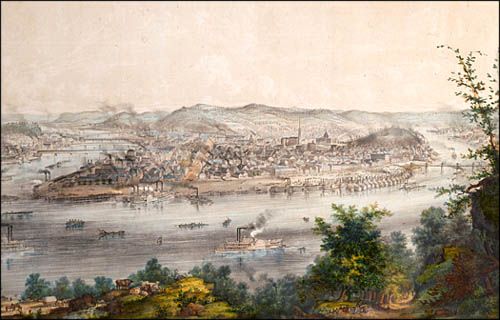
B. F. Smith lithograph of Pittsburgh viewed from Coal Hill, 1849, showing the recovering city

It is impossible for any one, although a spectator of the dreaded scene of destruction which presented to the eyes of our citizens on the memorable tenth of April, to give more than a faint idea of the terrible overwhelming calamity which then befell our city, destroying in a few hours the labor of many years, and blasting suddenly the cherished hopes of hundreds – we may say thousands – of our citizens, who, but that morning were contented in the possession of comfortable homes and busy workshops. The blow was so sudden and unexpected as to unnerve the most self possessed.

However, this mood did not last long and the city was shortly rebuilt. The sudden dearth of structures resulted in skyrocketing property values and a coordinate construction boom that quickly replaced many of the destroyed structures, and after two months, even though "passways [were] scarcely opened through the heaps of stone, brick and iron," 400–500 new buildings had been erected in the burned area. Although the new homes, warehouses and shops were built of better materials and improved architecture compared to those destroyed, the problems remained, with industrialist Andrew Carnegie commenting in 1848 on the fire-prone wooden buildings, and later on the smoke and soot-filled air. The market for replacement homes and household articles further invigorated the industries, and the fire was held to have "spurred the city to greater growth," an attitude encouraged by Pittsburgh's industrialists. This role of the fire was commemorated a century later with a celebration of the anniversary.

== Historical markers ==
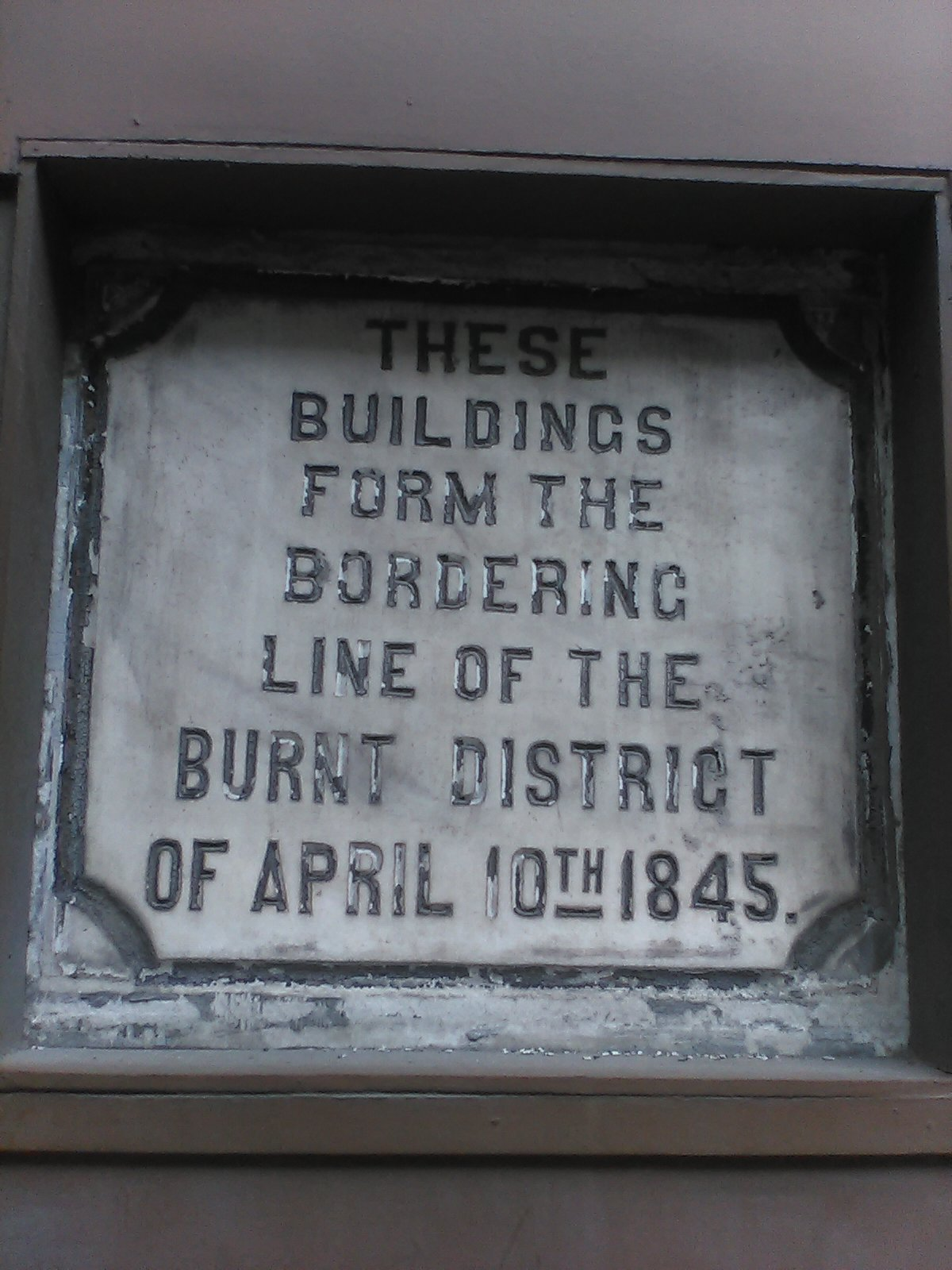
Great Fire of Pittsburgh historical marker

On the building at 411 Smithfield Street, between Fourth Avenue and Forbes Avenue, is a stone historical marker saying "These buildings form the bordering line of the burnt district of April 10th, 1845."

== See also ==
- Great Chicago Fire – 1871
- Great Fire of London – 1666
- Great Fire of Toronto (1849)
- Great Toronto Fire – 1904

== Sources ==
- Adams, Marcellin C. (1942). "Pittsburgh's Great Fire of 1845". Western Pennsylvania Historical Magazine. 25: 17–36.
- Arensberg, Charles F. C. (1945). "The Pittsburgh Fire of April 10, 1845". Western Pennsylvania Historical Magazine. 28: 11–19.
- Cook, Donald E. Jr. (1968). "The Great Fire of Pittsburgh in 1845, or How a Great American City Turned Disaster into Victory". Western Pennsylvania History. 51 (2): 127–153.
- Dawson, Charles T., ed. (1889). Our Fireman. The History of the Pittsburgh Fire Department from the Village Period until the Present Time. Pittsburgh. pp. 270–280.
- Foster, J. Heron (1845). A Full Account of The Great Fire at Pittsburgh of the Tenth Day of April, 1845. Pittsburgh: J. W. Cook.
- Hoffer, Peter Charles (2006). Seven fires: the urban infernos that reshaped America. New York: PublicAffairs Books. pp. 63–103. ISBN 978-1-58648-355-5.
