= Centre Avenue (Pittsburgh) =

Street in Pittsburgh, Pennsylvania, United States

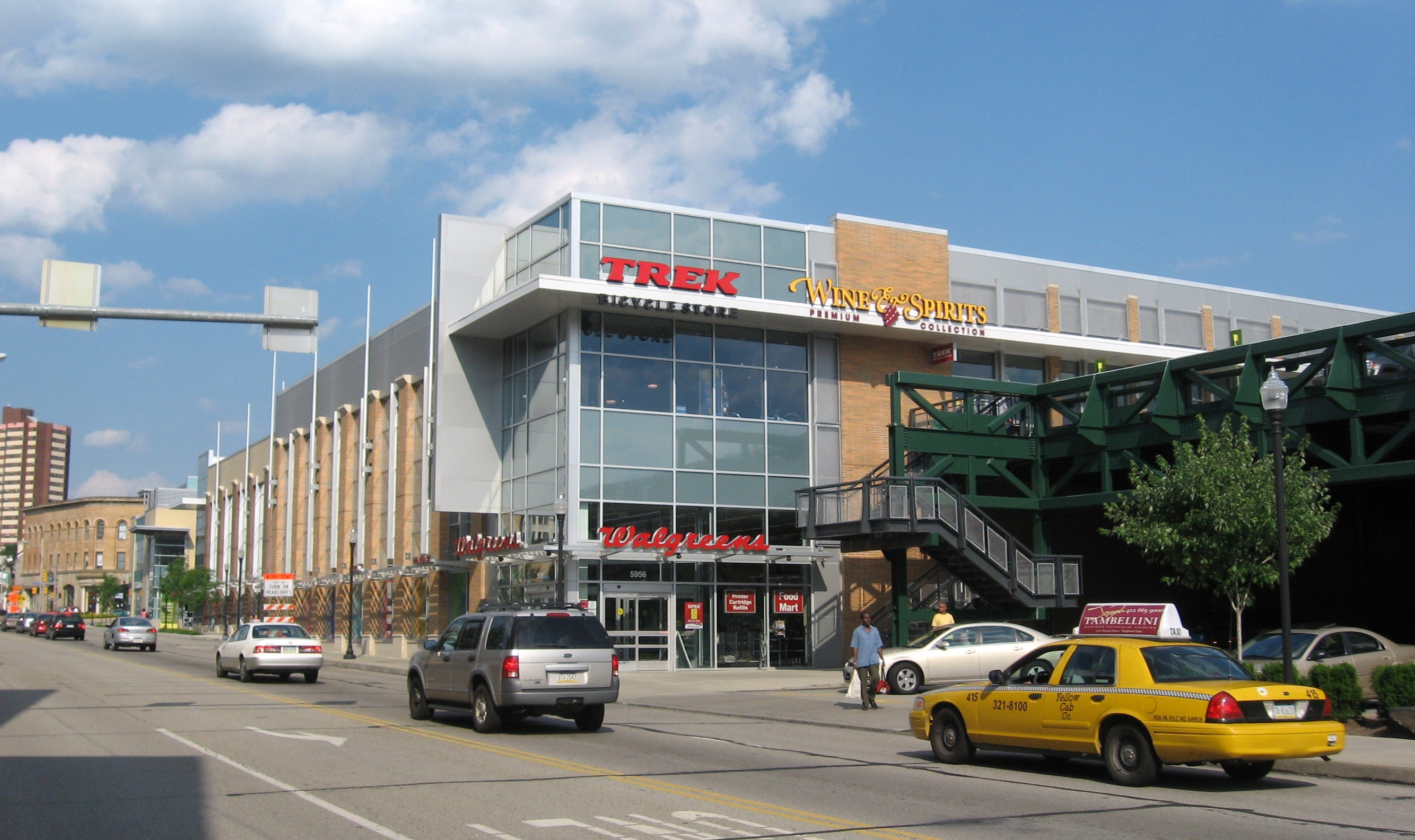
- Centre Avenue in East Liberty
- Component highways: PA 380 between Euclid Avenue and Station Street
- Location: Pittsburgh, Pennsylvania, United States
- West end: Sixth Avenue in Downtown
- Major junctions: PA 380 (Penn Avenue) in East Liberty
- East end: East Liberty Blvd in East Liberty

Centre Avenue is a main thoroughfare in Pittsburgh, Pennsylvania, United States. It stretches from Sixth Avenue near the Allegheny County Courthouse to East Liberty.

Because of redevelopments to areas at both ends of Centre Avenue, the street is now somewhat shorter than it had been in 1970. At its downtown end, it now ends at Sixth Avenue. It lost about 500 feet (160 m) when the old Plaza building was razed and the "T" (subway) was built. At its other terminus, it was shortened by about 1000 feet (320 m) when East Liberty was re-designed and Penn Circle South produced. Charts produced prior to 1970 were drawn with Centre Avenue longer than its current length.

Centre Avenue was extended in 2014, when the streets composing Penn Circle were renamed to their old names.
