= Pittsburgh Pike =

Route information
- History: Chartered in 1805; Completed on May 20, 1818

Major junctions
- West end: Pittsburgh, PA
- East end: Harrisburg, PA

Location
- Country: United States
- State: Pennsylvania

Highway system
- 19th Century Turnpikes

The Pittsburgh Pike was an early toll road in the United States.

== History and notable features ==
The road was chartered as the Harrisburg and Pittsburgh Turnpike in 1805, and upon completion on May 20, 1818, it enabled travelers to go from Pittsburgh to Harrisburg, Pennsylvania over the Allegheny Mountains, cutting freight rates in half because wagons increased their capacity, speed, and certainty.

It cost $4,850 per mile ($3,010/km) to build. Private interests contributed 62 percent of the capital; the government of Pennsylvania provided the remaining amount. In 1814, the company was broken up into five constituent parts:

- Greensburg and Pittsburgh Turnpike, Pittsburgh to Greensburg
- Somerset and Greensburg Turnpike, Greensburg to Stoystown
- Bedford and Somerset Turnpike, Stoystown to Bedford
- Chambersburg and Bedford Turnpike, Bedford to Chambersburg
- Harrisburg, Carlisle, and Chambersburg Turnpike

Of these turnpikes, the first four were included in the Lincoln Highway, and later PA 1 and US 30. The Chambersburg and Harrisburg was not included in any major auto trails, but was included in PA 13, and later US 11

== See also ==
- Susquehanna and Tioga Turnpike
