= Interstate 376 =

Highway in Pennsylvania

Interstate 376
- I-376 highlighted in red

Route information
- Auxiliary route of I-76
- Maintained by PennDOT and PTC
- Length: 84.427 mi (135.872 km)
- Existed: October 2, 1972–present
- History: Extended 2009
- NHS: Entire route

Major junctions
- West end: I-80 / PA 760 near Hermitage
- US 422 in Union Township; US 224 in Union Township; I-76 / Penna Turnpike in Big Beaver; PA Turnpike 576 at Pittsburgh International Airport; US 22 / US 30 / Orange Belt / PA 60 in Robinson Township; I-79 near Carnegie; US 19 / US 19 Truck / PA 51 in Pittsburgh; I-279 / US 19 Truck in Pittsburgh; US 30 in Wilkinsburg
- East end: I-76 Toll / Penna Turnpike / US 22 / US 22 Bus. in Monroeville

Location
- Country: United States
- State: Pennsylvania
- Counties: Mercer, Lawrence, Beaver, Allegheny

Highway system
- Interstate Highway System; Main; Auxiliary; Suffixed; Business; Future; Pennsylvania State Route System; Interstate; US; State; Scenic; Legislative
← PA 374	→ PA 376

Interstate 376 (I-376) is a major auxiliary route of the Interstate Highway System in the US state of Pennsylvania, located within the Allegheny Plateau. It runs from I-80 near Sharon south and east to a junction with the Pennsylvania Turnpike (I-76, its parent) in Monroeville, after having crossed the Pennsylvania Turnpike at an interchange in Big Beaver. The route serves Pittsburgh and its surrounding areas and is the main access road to Pittsburgh International Airport (PIT). Portions of the route are known as the Beaver Valley Expressway, Southern Expressway, and Airport Parkway. Within Allegheny County, the route runs along the majority of the Penn-Lincoln Parkway, known locally as Parkway West and Parkway East. It is currently the ninth-longest auxiliary Interstate route in the system and second only to I-476 within Pennsylvania.

I-376 is signed east–west despite running north–south for nearly three-quarters of its length; however, it does run east–west through the majority of Allegheny County. This is because, until 2009, the route's western terminus was at I-279 in Downtown Pittsburgh; it was extended west and north to I-80 to give the corridor a single route designation. Despite the route's direction, it serves as a major artery through Pittsburgh's West End, with I-79 being the primary route through Pittsburgh's North Hills. Since its 2009 extension, the route has also served as a major way to access Northeast Ohio.

A 16-mile (26 km) stretch of the Beaver Valley Expressway, officially named the James E. Ross Highway, from exit 15 where I-376 ends its brief concurrency with U.S. Route 422 (US 422) to exit 31 where I-376 has its first interchange with Pennsylvania Route 51 (PA 51), is tolled and is maintained by the Pennsylvania Turnpike Commission (PTC), while the remainder of the highway is maintained by the Pennsylvania Department of Transportation (PennDOT). Near the airport, I-376 also has a business loop.

== Route description ==
=== Beaver Valley Expressway and Airport Parkway ===
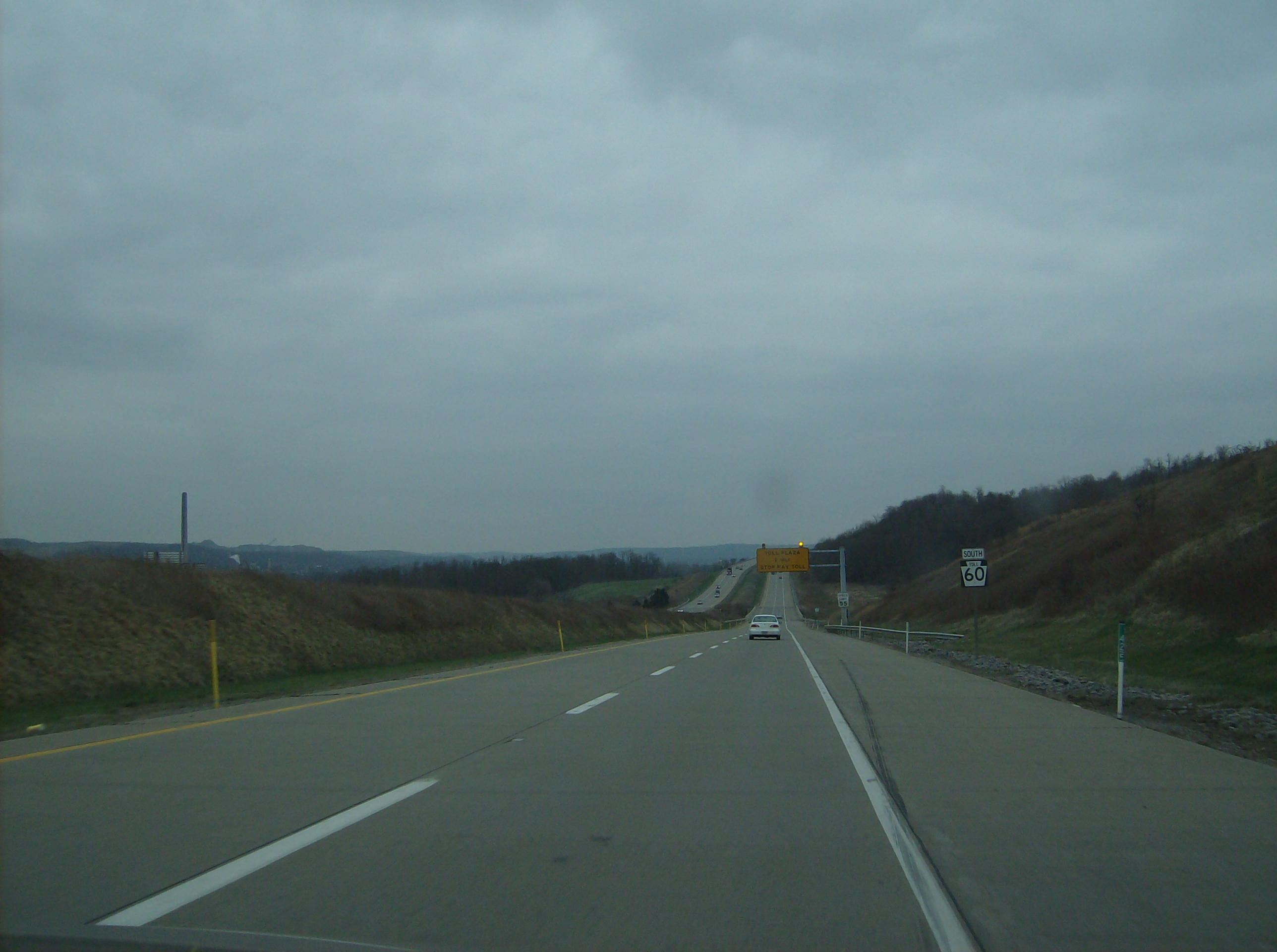
Eastward along the toll section of I-376 (then PA 60) in North Beaver Township, Lawrence County

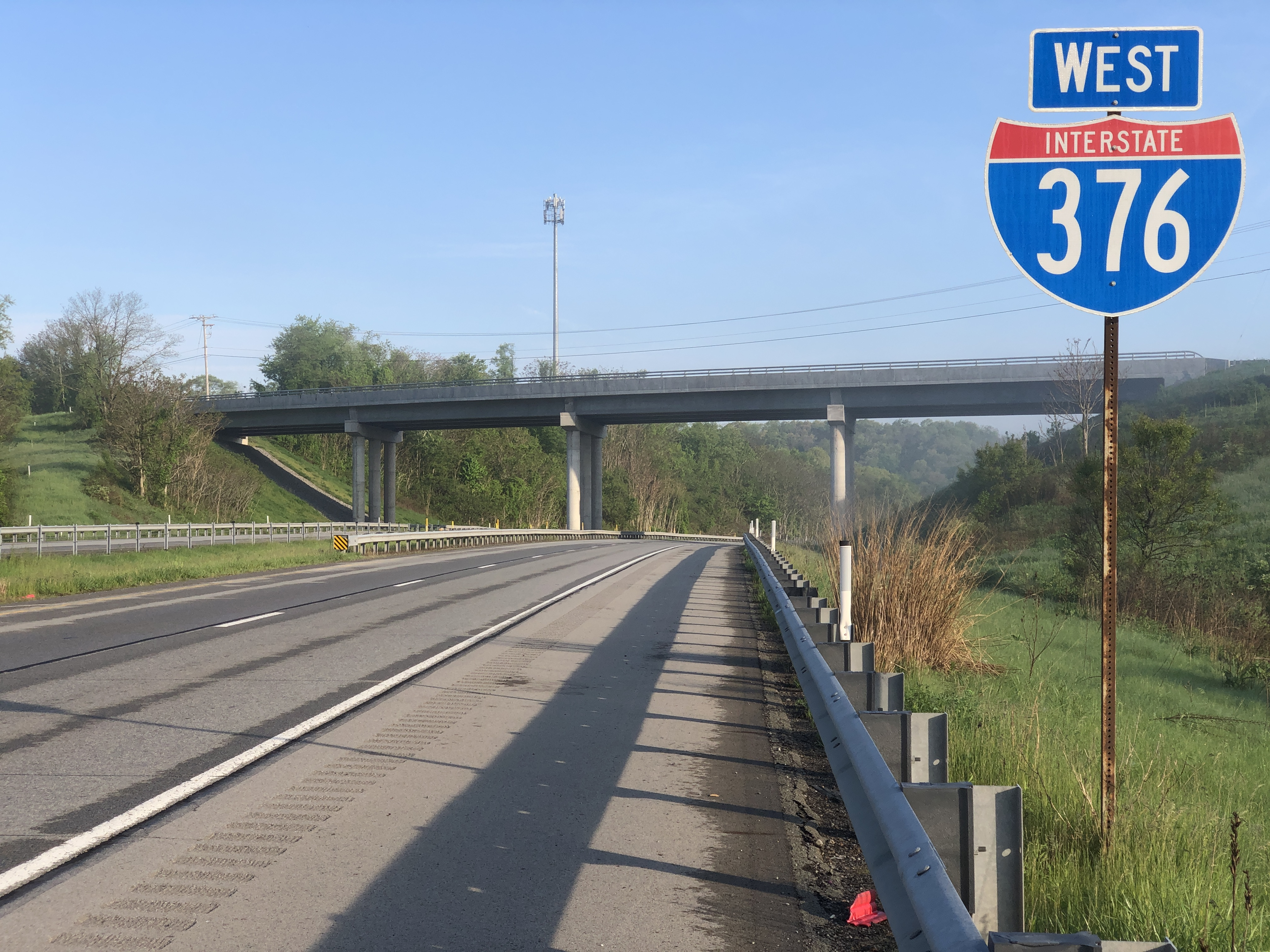
I-376 westbound past the Brighton Road interchange in Brighton Township

I-376 begins at a cloverleaf interchange with I-80 and PA 760 located four miles (6.4 km) east of Ohio within the Glaciated Allegheny Plateau. From there, it travels in a southerly direction on the Beaver Valley Expressway, a four-lane freeway with a wide grass median. Paralleling PA 18, I-376 has its first interchange with that state highway in West Middlesex.

I-376 soon meets US 422 and forms an overlap with that highway along the west side of New Castle. After an interchange with US 224 in Union Township, I-376 eastbound splits from US 422 at a trumpet interchange southwest of the city in Taylor Township. At this point, I-376 becomes a toll road officially named the James E. Ross Highway.

I-376 continues southward, still paralleled by PA 18 and the Beaver River to the east. Shortly after entering Beaver County near Koppel, the route connects to its parent route I-76 (Pennsylvania Turnpike) for the first time at an interchange which also provides access to PA 351. Around this area, I-376 crosses into the Unglaciated Allegheny Plateau, where it remains for the remainder of its length.

I-376 then passes to the east of West Mayfield and becomes a non-tolled highway again at its first interchange with PA 51 in Chippewa Township, just west of Beaver Falls. The freeway then weaves through mountainous terrain, interchanging with PA 68 in Vanport just before crossing the Vanport Bridge over the Ohio River. It then has its second interchange with PA 18 near Kobuta and continues south from there. I-376 passes to the west of Aliquippa before leaving Beaver County and entering Allegheny County.

Approaching PIT, I-376 bends south-southwest and becomes the Southern Expressway, while the Beaver Valley Expressway diverges to the southeast along I-376 Business (I-376 Bus). I-376 circles around the southern edge of the airport, intersecting the western terminus of the Southern Beltway (PA Turnpike 576) at the main entrance to PIT before recombining with I-376 Bus and becoming the Airport Parkway, still four lanes and with a narrow median.

=== Parkway West ===
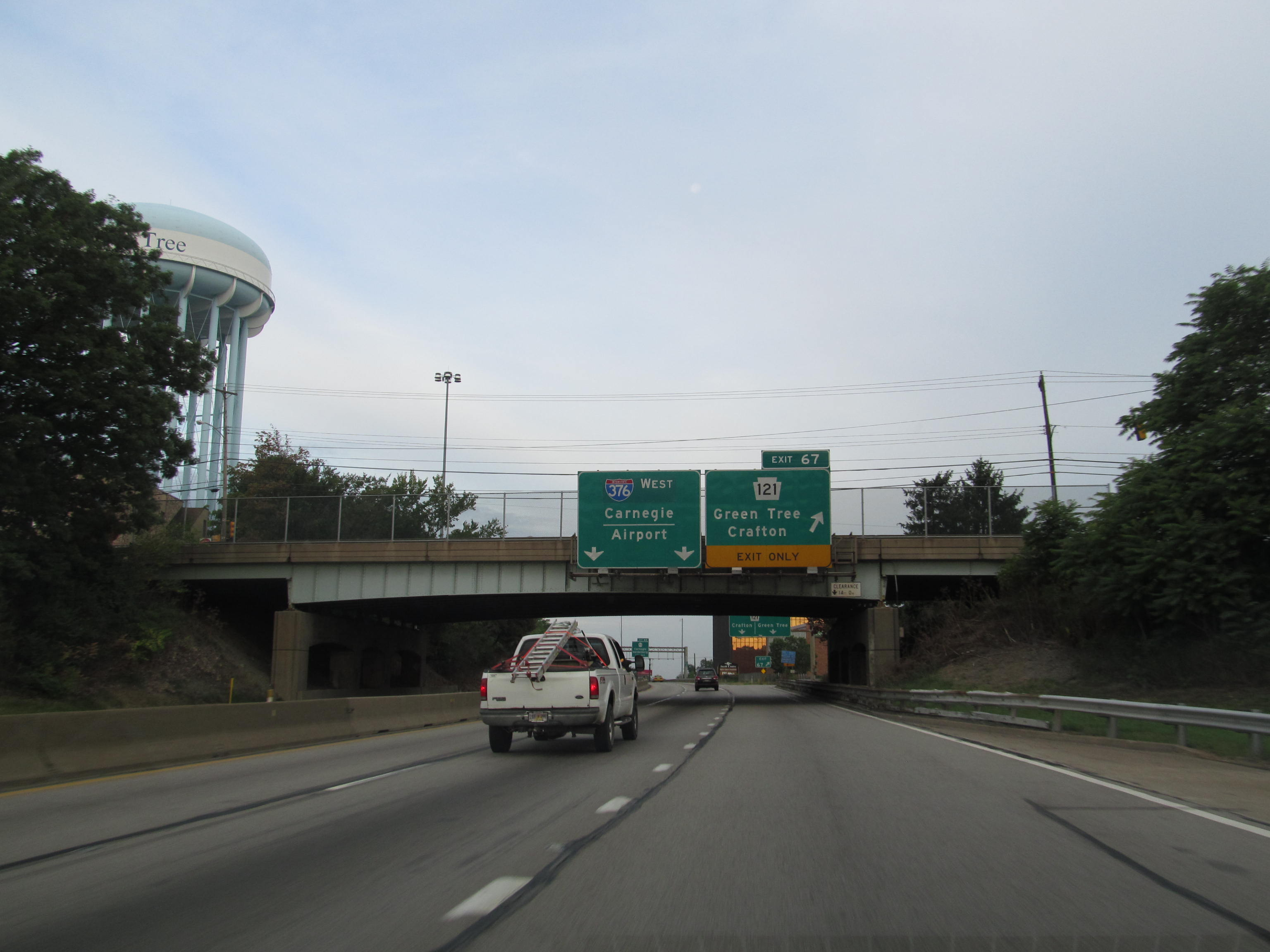
I-376 westbound at the PA 121 exit in Green Tree

Now traveling southeast, the route comes to a partial cloverleaf interchange with the Penn-Lincoln Parkway (US 22 and US 30) and Steubenville Pike (PA 60) in Robinson Township. The two US Routes join I-376 here in a partially-unsigned concurrency (indicated only on reassurance markers), continuing east-southeastward bearing the Penn-Lincoln Parkway name, and soon reach an interchange with I-79. From that point eastward, along what was known for many years as I-279, I-376 runs east-southeast through Rosslyn Farms and Carnegie before turning northeast and passing through Green Tree.

Entering the city of Pittsburgh, I-376 winds its way northeast to its second interchange with PA 51 at Saw Mill Run Boulevard, which is also part of a spread-out series of ramps linking Banksville Road (US 19) and US 19 Truck. This junction, located just before the freeway passes under Mount Washington in the Fort Pitt Tunnel, features the infamous wrong-way concurrency of the northbound and southbound directions of US 19 Truck.

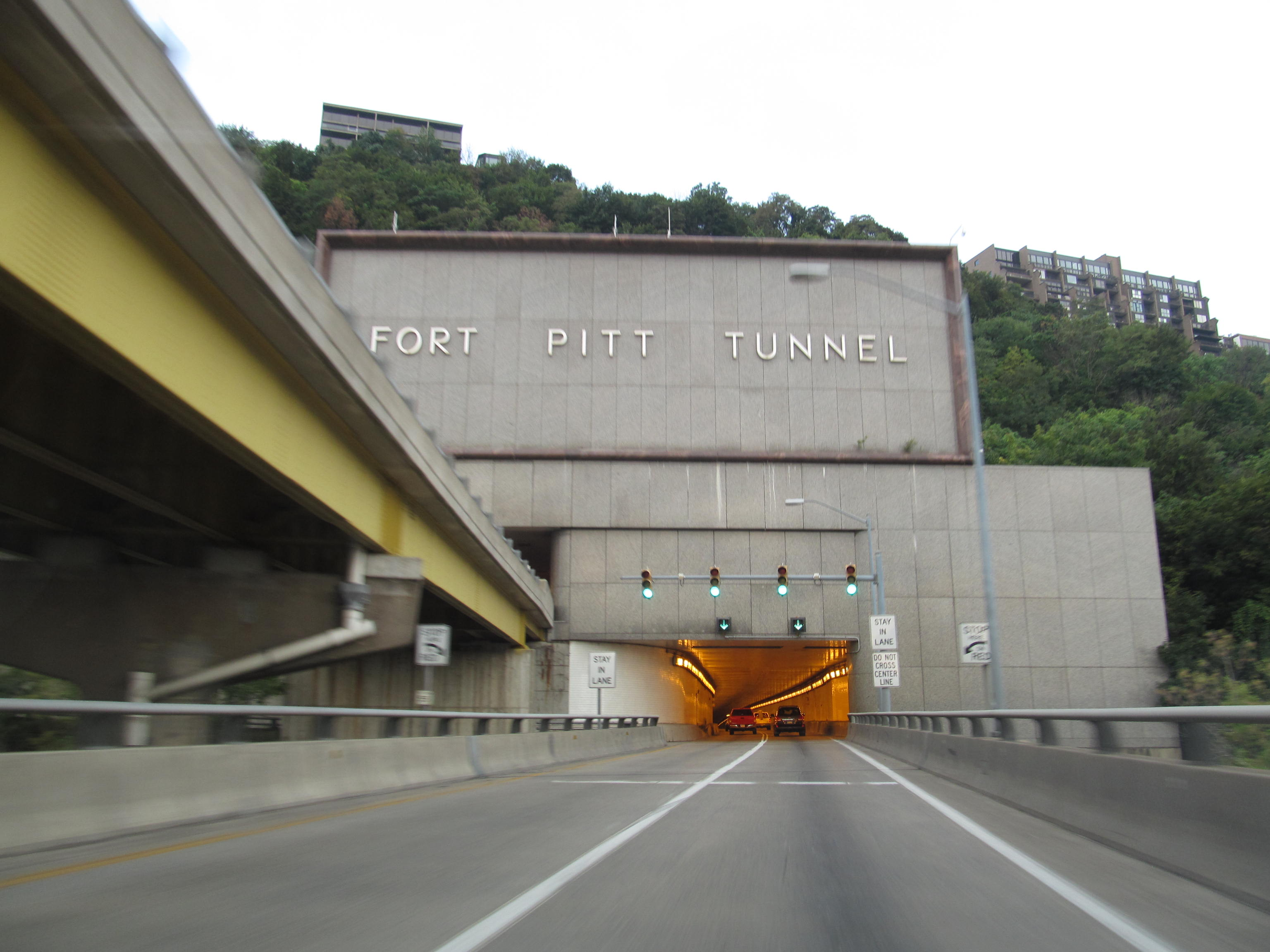
I-376 westbound between the Fort Pitt Bridge and Fort Pitt Tunnel

After passing through the Fort Pitt Tunnel, I-376 emerges onto the four-lane double-deck Fort Pitt Bridge, crossing over the Monongahela River. There are single-lane westbound exit and eastbound entrance ramps connecting Carson Street to the freeway between the tunnel's portal and the bridge. Once across the river, the route touches down in Downtown Pittsburgh at Point State Park. An interchange at the Point connects I-376 to I-279 (Parkway North), which leads to the Fort Duquesne Bridge, as well as Liberty Avenue.

=== Parkway East ===
I-376 continues east from the Point, still carrying the partially-unsigned US 22 and US 30, following the north shore of the Monongahela River through the south side of the downtown area (the westbound area by Downtown from Grant Street to the Fort Pitt Bridge is locally known as the "Bathtub" because of a tendency of the underpass to flood in heavy rains). The road then continues to the adjacent neighborhoods of Uptown and Oakland. The Parkway East eventually turns away from the river near the southwestern corner of Schenley Park and runs along that park's southern border before passing through the Squirrel Hill Tunnel under Squirrel Hill.

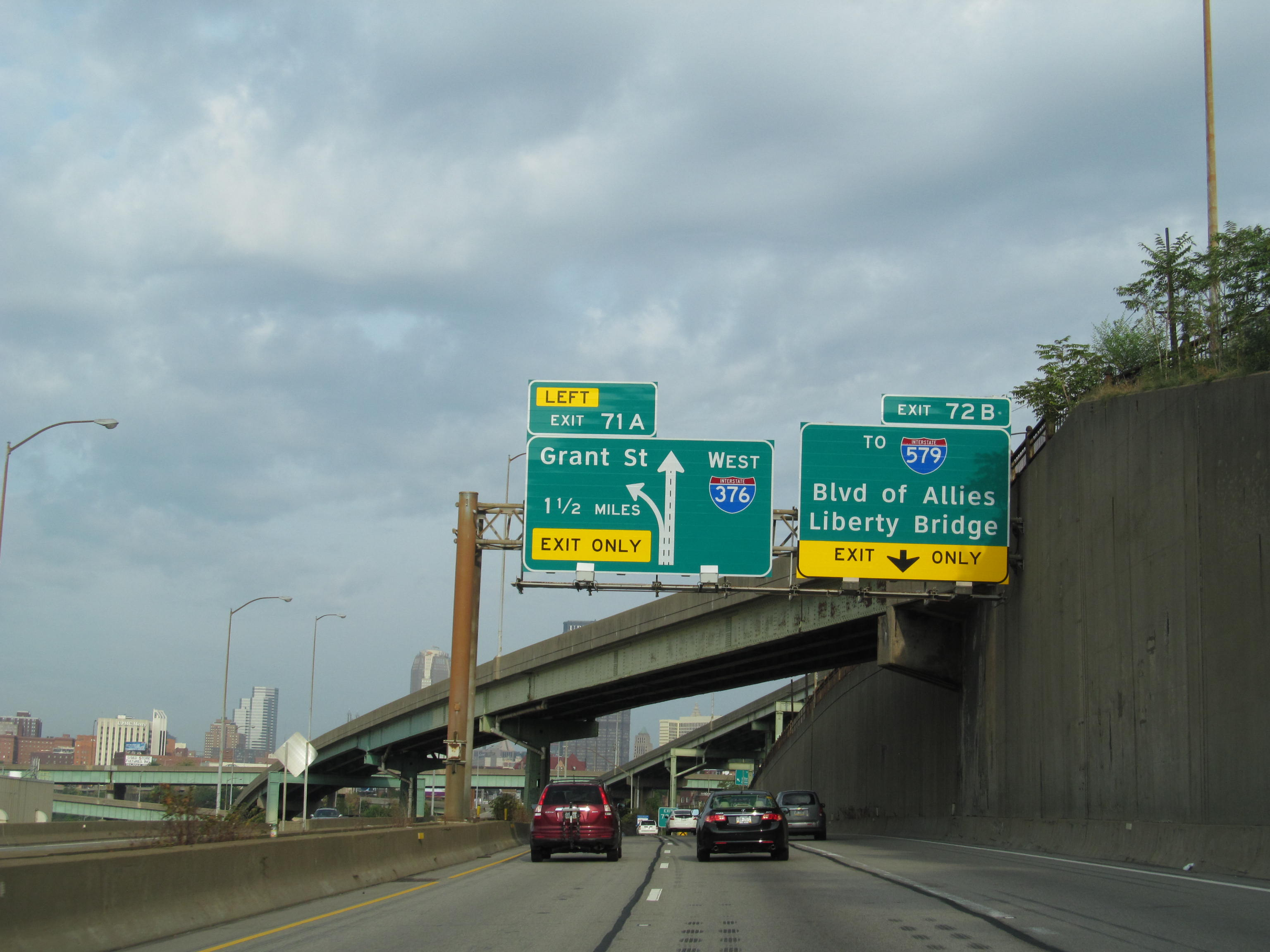
I-376 westbound approaching Downtown Pittsburgh

Parkway East exits the city of Pittsburgh near the southeastern corner of Frick Park, and US 30 leaves the freeway shortly thereafter at PA 8 in the suburb of Wilkinsburg. I-376 and US 22 (now fully signed) continue in a generally easterly direction through Churchill, Wilkins Township, Penn Hills, and finally Monroeville, where I-376 ends at an interchange with the Pennsylvania Turnpike and US 22 Bus. US 22 continues east from this interchange on the William Penn Highway toward Murrysville.

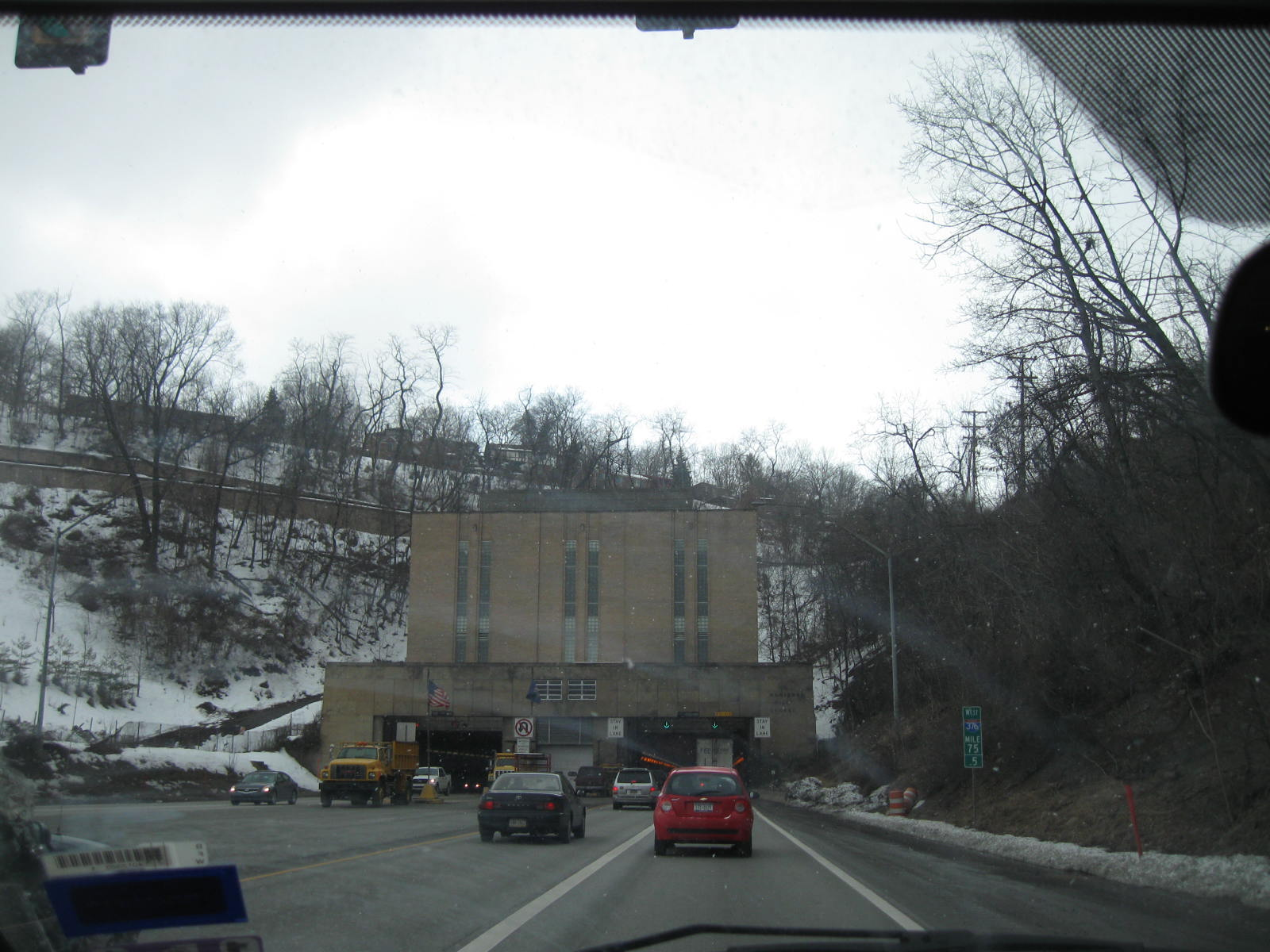
I-376 westbound at the Squirrel Hill Tunnel

== Tolls ==
The James E. Ross Highway portion of I-376 between US 422 and PA 51 uses all-electronic tolling, with tolls payable by toll by plate (which uses automatic license plate recognition to take a photo of the vehicle's license plate and mail a bill to the vehicle owner) or E-ZPass. The tolled section of I-376 has two mainline toll plazas: the West Mainline Toll Plaza near milepost 18 and the East Mainline Toll Plaza near milepost 30. As of 2024, the West Mainline Toll Plaza costs $5.50 using toll by plate and $2.90 using E-ZPass for passenger vehicles while the East Mainline Toll Plaza costs $3.50 using toll by plate and $1.50 using E-ZPass for passenger vehicles. There are also ramp tolls at the eastbound exit and westbound entrance at exit 17, the westbound exit and eastbound entrance at exit 20, and the eastbound exit and westbound entrance at exit 29, which charge $3.50 using toll by plate and $1.50 using E-ZPass for passenger vehicles. As part of Act 44, tolls are to be increased every year in January.

The tolled portion of I-376 is the most expensive portion of the Pennsylvania Turnpike system per mile, charging toll-by-plate users an average of $0.44 per mile ($0.27/km) and E-ZPass users $0.20 per mile ($0.12/km). This is in stark contrast to the mainline Turnpike, which charges less than $0.12 per mile ($0.07/km) for E-ZPass users and more than $0.17 per mile ($0.11/km) for cash users. This is due to the bonds on newer sections of the Turnpike system (such as the James E. Ross Highway, Amos K. Hutchinson Bypass, Mon–Fayette Expressway, and the Southern Beltway) having not been paid for yet (in the case of the latter two, are only partially completed), whereas the mainline Turnpike and the Northeastern Extension had their bonds paid for decades ago. Even with the newer sections factored in—most of which except for a portion of the Mon–Fayette Expressway from I-70 near Bentleyville to US 40 near Brownsville opened after the James E. Ross Highway opened—it is the most expensive portion of the Turnpike system per mile.

== History ==
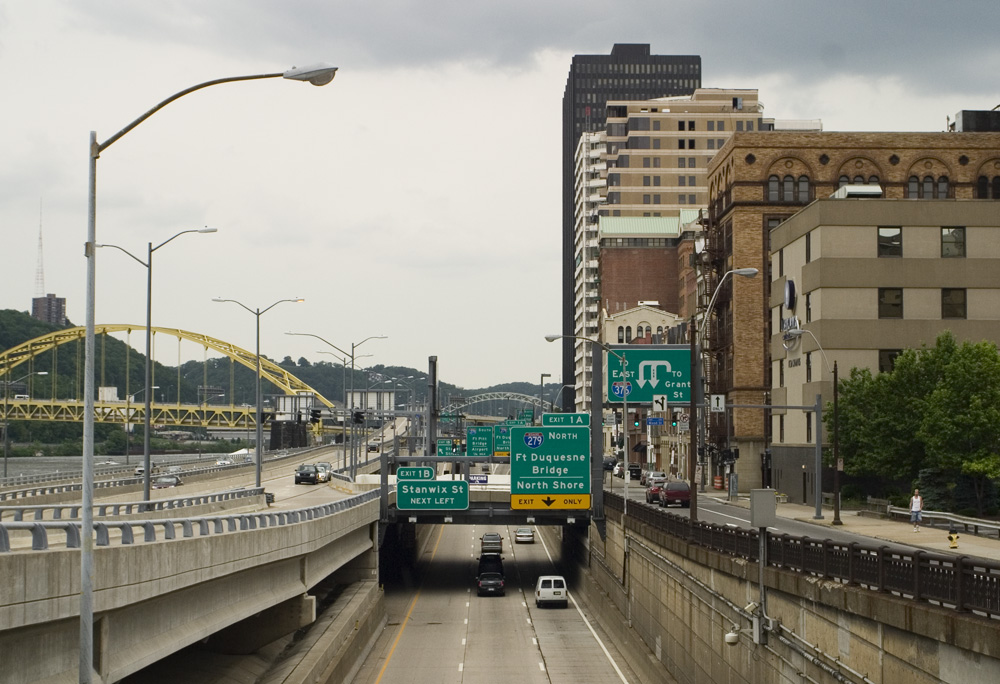
I-376 westbound from the Smithfield Street Bridge in Downtown Pittsburgh in 2007 prior to the route being extended, looking west

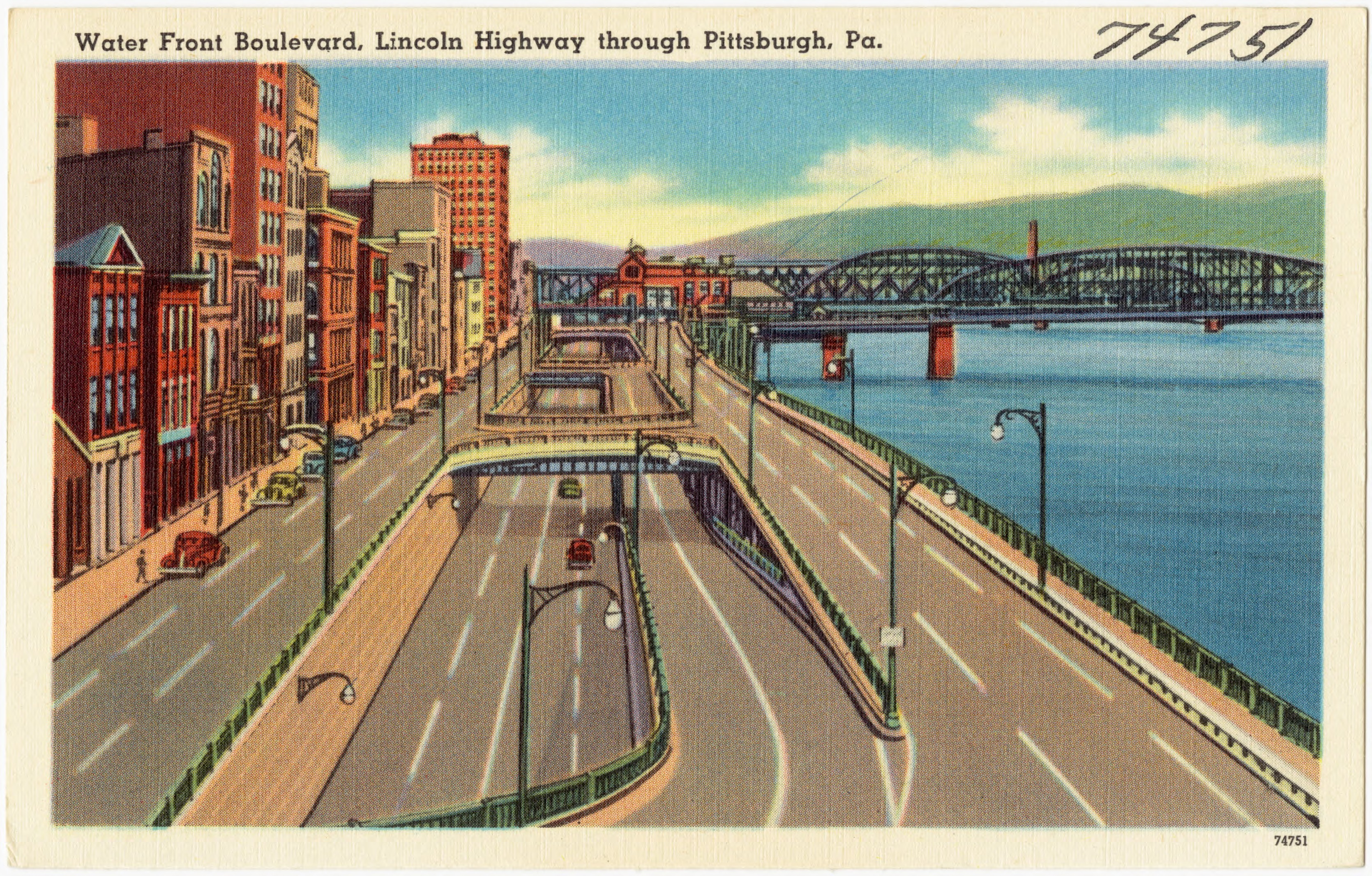
Postcard from the 1930s or 1940s of the section parallel to Fort Pitt Boulevard along the Monongahela River, looking east

The first section of what would eventually become I-376 opened June 5, 1953, from PA 885 (Bates Street) near the Hot Metal Bridge east through the Squirrel Hill Tunnel to US 22 Bus (then US 22) at Churchill. Construction commenced on this stretch on July 25, 1946, near Wilkinsburg. The next section to open, running from PA 60 (Steubenville Pike, then US 22/US 30) near PIT east to Saw Mill Run Boulevard (PA 51 and US 19), opened October 15, 1953. At Steubenville Pike, it connected to PA 60—the Airport Parkway—which had been built c. 1950 as a high-speed surface road to provide access to the airport.

In 1955, the Baltimore and Ohio Station was demolished to make way for construction of the new freeway. In late 1956, it opened from the Boulevard of the Allies (then US 22/US 30) near the Birmingham Bridge east to Bates Street, with the eastbound lanes opening September 10 and westbound opening September 29. The other downtown sections opened in segments from January 17, 1958, to 1959, the total cost of the parkway at this time came to $112.11 million (equivalent to $920 million in 2024). The $6.31-million (equivalent to $51.7 million in 2024) Fort Pitt Bridge opened June 19, 1959, followed by the $16-million (equivalent to $130 million in 2024) Fort Pitt Tunnel on September 1, 1960, using the West End Bypass (PA 51) and Carson Street (PA 837) as detours until the Fort Pitt Tunnel opened. The Parkway East ended in Churchill, with eastbound traffic continuing ahead on the William Penn Highway, until the $11.12-million (equivalent to $88.1 million in 2024) extension east to the Pennsylvania Turnpike in Monroeville opened October 27, 1962. The final piece of Parkway West (the part which has never had an Interstate route number), from PA 60 west to the US 22/US 30 split at Imperial, opened in 1964. Early plans for that section would have instead taken it from PA 60 where it splits with PA 60 Bus. northwest to US 30 near Campmeeting Road at Clinton.

The next section that opened was in 1968 from the present-day exit 2 with PA 18 to where PA 18 intersects with the present-day PA 760 just north of I-80 and the western terminus of I-376.

Work began on the Beaver County sections of I-376 (in between Chippewa Township and the Airport Parkway) in 1971 and would finish by 1976. The following year, the northern section finished construction, which would leave a gap between New Castle and Chippewa Township for the next 15 years. Until the middle section was completed, in order to continue on the highway, travelers had to use US 422, PA 168, PA 18, PA 251, and PA 51 before returning to the highway. Until that section opened, the present-day exit 12A marked the southern terminus of the northern section of PA 60 as an "END 60" sign was located near the exit.

In the early to mid-1980s, the entire section from downtown to Monroeville was refurbished.

The Southern Expressway, a southern bypass of PIT, opened on September 9, 1992, and is the newest portion of I-376.

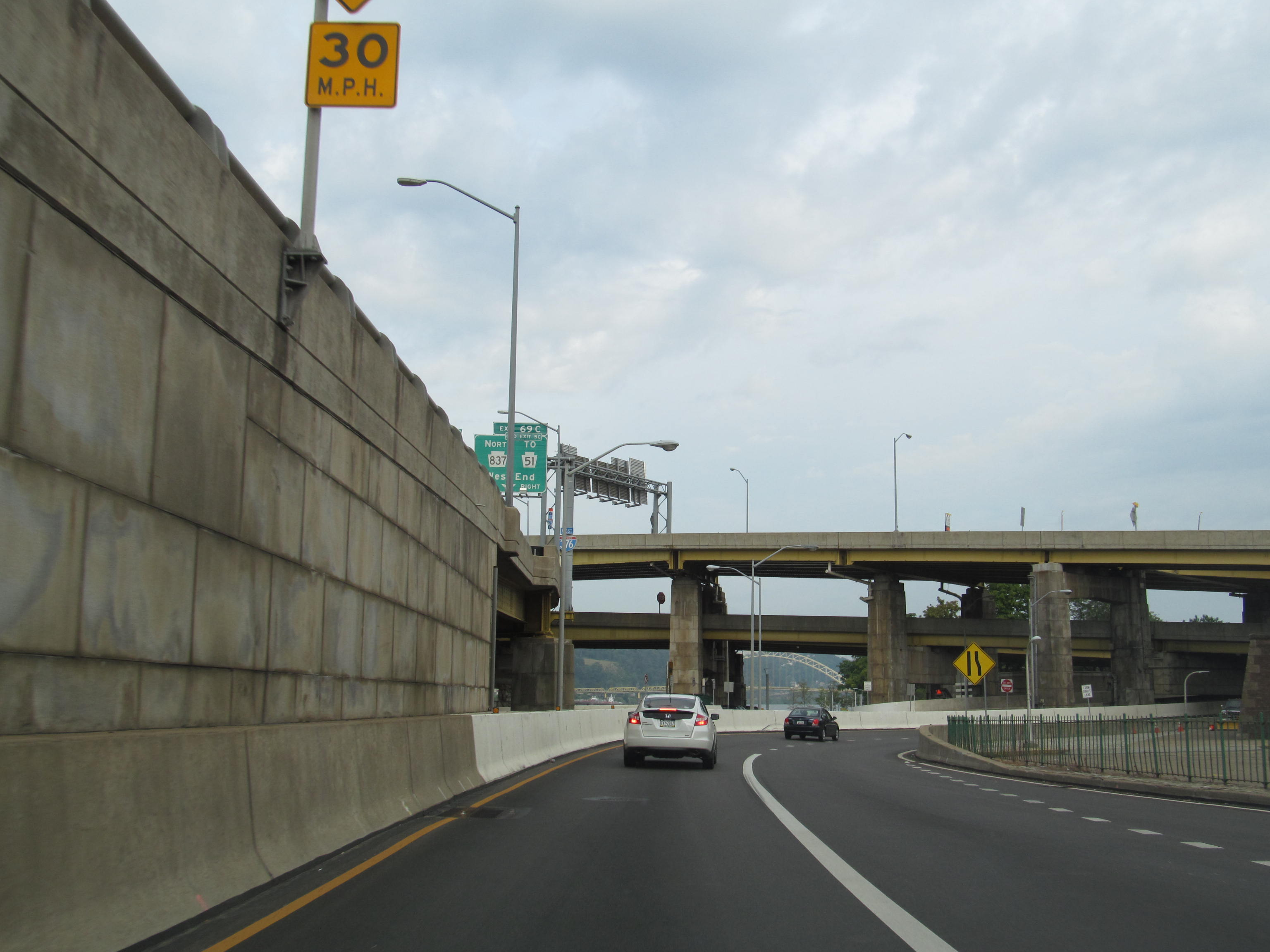
I-376 at the interchange with I-279 in Pittsburgh in 2012

The next leg of the route opened to PA 108 in 1991 and to PA 51 in Chippewa on November 30, 1992, as the 16.5-mile (26.6 km) $260-million (equivalent to $520 million in 2024) "missing link" between two sections of PA 60, when that route's designation was on the highway. The aforementioned "END 60" sign was removed when the first leg of the middle section opened in 1991, and a "No re-entry this exit" sign has sat on the site since due to exit 12A being an indirect connection to US 422 westbound without a direct reentry ramp.

In 2003, the toll plaza at the PA turnpike interchange was removed.

The PTC retrofitted E-ZPass lanes on the tolled section of I-376 in 2006 at both the two mainline toll plazas as well as the exits that collect tolls.

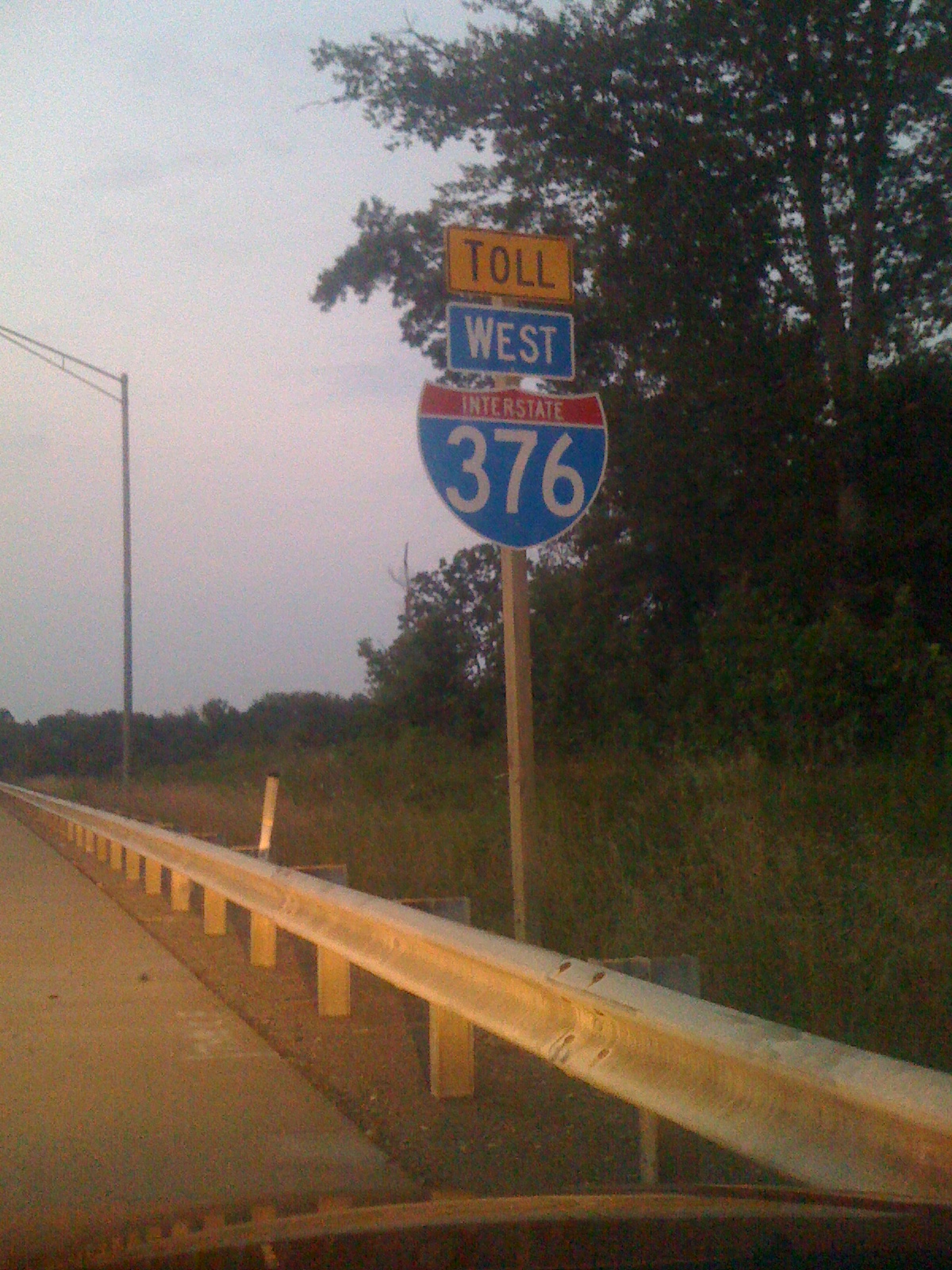
A "Toll I-376" trailblazer on the tolled section of I-376

As part of the Safe, Accountable, Flexible, Efficient Transportation Equity Act: A Legacy for Users in 2005, Congress had designated an expansion of I-376 past I-79 and along present day US 22/US 30 and PA 60 through Pittsburgh International Airport and north to I-80 near Sharon. This was done because the airport was one of the few major airports in the US without direct access to an Interstate Highway. This routing required some major infrastructure work on US 22 west of Downtown Pittsburgh (particularly at the US 22/US 30 cloverleaf interchange in Robinson Township) and safety improvements to PA 60; though both were controlled-access freeways before the extension, they were not up to Interstate Highway standards in all areas. The improvements to both the US 22/US 30 cloverleaf in Robinson Township and the Lawrence County leg of the route, as well as replacing all of the signs with the I-376 shield, were funded by the American Recovery and Reinvestment Act of 2009. The designation of I-279 from Downtown west through the Fort Pitt Tunnel to I-79 was officially dropped and replaced by that of I-376 on June 10, 2009. I-279 still exists between I-376 in the Golden Triangle and I-79 in Franklin Park. On November 6, 2009, officials announced the initial transition was complete. On January 21, 2010, the remainder of the route except for the Beaver Valley Expressway started receiving the I-376 signs. The stretch of PA 60 from I-80 in Shenango Township of Mercer County north past PA 18 (where the freeway terminates and the highway reverts to being a two-lane arterial) to the former northern terminus of PA 60 in Sharon became PA 760. On August 1, 2010, signage along PA Turnpike 60 was officially changed to I-376, and, unlike other tolled highways with an Interstate designation, it is not grandfathered from Interstate standards. Having been built in the early 1990s, this section was already up to Interstate standards. This section of I-376 is signed as "Toll I-376", with a black-on-yellow "Toll" sign above the I-376 trailblazer. This makes I-376 one of the first tolled Interstates with such a marker, which was a new addition to the 2009 edition of the Manual on Uniform Traffic Control Devices. Despite PennDOT giving motorists over four years of advance notice on the I-376 extension, some local drivers were confused after the transition was complete, thinking that the I-376 extension was going to be an all-new highway instead of a renaming of PA 60.

In 2014, exit 1C was rebuilt into a full interchange rather than legacy eastbound exit, mainly to serve as access to I-80 to West Middlesex residents. It marked the third partial interchange on the legacy PA 60/Parkway West to be upgraded to a full-service interchange in a decade, after I-79 at exit 64A and access to US 30 at exit 52 were upgraded from partial to full-service interchanges.

Along with the Delaware River–Turnpike Toll Bridge (which is affected by the ongoing Pennsylvania Turnpike/Interstate 95 Interchange Project), the Beaver Valley Expressway became one of the first sections of the Pennsylvania Turnpike system to implement all-electronic tolling, which began along the Beaver Valley Expressway on April 30, 2017. The Beaver Valley Expressway was selected as a test area so that the PTC could work out any bugs with mailing non-E-ZPass users bills with their unpaid tolls.

A bridge crossing I-376 from Oakland to Greenfield, the Greenfield Bridge, gained some national notoriety on an episode of Last Week Tonight with John Oliver concerning infrastructure. The state could not immediately afford to replace the crumbling bridge, so instead a cover was built under the bridge to protect the vehicles on I-376. The Greenfield Bridge was finally demolished in December 2015, and a replacement was built over the following two years, officially opening on October 14, 2017.

In 2026 a new bridge was built next to the bridge on the Parkway East over Commercial Street and Nine Mile Run in Frick Park then slid into place where the older bridge had been after the older bridge was demolished.

=== Route designations prior to 2009 ===
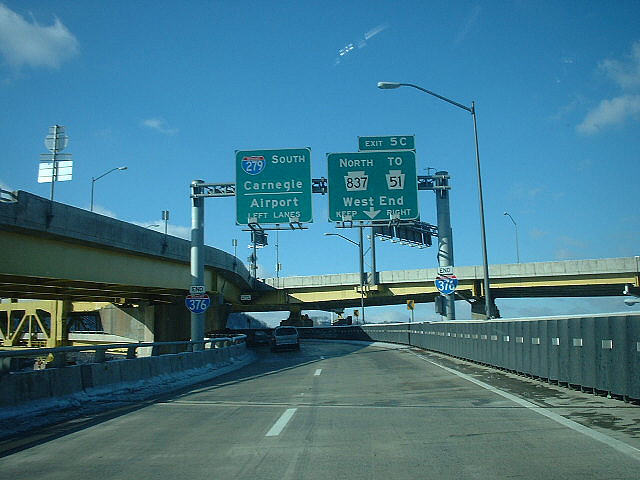
The western end of I-376 at I-279 in Pittsburgh in 2003. Upon its extension in 2009, the END panels were replaced with WEST panels

From PA 60 to I-376's eastern terminus, I-376 has had the US 22 and US 30 designations for its entire history (US 30 exiting at Wilkinsburg). Until 1961, it also carried the PA 80 designation until that route was decommissioned due to Pennsylvania needing the designation for I-80 to the north. In 1956, PA 60 was commissioned to have the Airport Parkway and the former alignment of US 22 and US 30 to Pittsburgh's West End.

From 1959 to 1964, I-70 occupied the highway east of PA 50 in Carnegie. When I-70 moved to its current alignment (replacing I-70S) in 1964, the route received the I-76 designation into Pittsburgh. West of Pittsburgh, from 1963 to 1970, I-79 occupied the route. In West Middlesex, the route would receive the PA 18 designation while the former alignment would receive a business route designation as PA 18 Business, since it served as a bypass of West Middlesex.

In 1970, I-79 swapped positions with I-279, necessitating that I-76 be extended to I-79. With commencement on the Beaver Valley Expressway in 1971, PA 60 was extended to its future northern terminus in Chippewa. Finally, on October 2, 1972, after I-76 west of Monroeville moved to the Pennsylvania Turnpike and replaced I-80S, the western part of the highway took the I-279 designation while the section from Pittsburgh east to Monroeville would become the first section with the I-376 designation. When I-376 was extended onto the Parkway West in 2009, I-279 was truncated to its current southern terminus at the former western terminus of I-376.

PA 18 Business was decommissioned in 1978 when PA 18 returned to its former alignment (where it has remained to this day) and PA 60 was extended all the way to Hermitage.

Pennsylvania Route 60 Toll
- Location: Chippewa Township – New Castle
- Existed: 1991–2009

On November 30, 1992, the 16.2-mile (26.1 km) gap in Beaver County was completed with a toll highway.

When the Beaver Valley Expressway started opening in 1991, it would receive the "PA Toll 60" designation, because it was operated by the PTC. With the opening of the Southern Expressway in 1992, PA 60 moved to that highway, while the Airport Parkway received the PA 60 Bus designation. PA 60 was eventually extended to Sharon in 1997, ending at US 62 Bus.

== Exit list ==
County	Location	mi	km	Old exit	New exit	Destinations	Notes
Mercer	Shenango Township	0.000	0.000		–	PA 760 north – Sharon	Continuation north; former PA 60
Mercer	Shenango Township	0.000	0.000		1	I-80 – Youngstown, Mercer	Signed as exits 1A (west) and 1B (east); exit 4A on I-80
Mercer	Shenango Township	0.546	0.879		1C	PA 318 – Mercer, West Middlesex	Became a full interchange in October 2014
Mercer	Shenango Township	1.734	2.791		2	PA 18 – West Middlesex	
Lawrence	Pulaski Township	5.103	8.212	25 (Note: Sequential exit number for PA 60 before redesignation to I-376)	5	PA 208 – New Wilmington, Pulaski Township	
Lawrence	Neshannock Township	9.439	15.191	24	9	Mitchell Road to PA 18	
Lawrence	Neshannock–Union township line	12.199	19.632		12	US 422 west / US 422 Bus. east (Sampson Street) – Youngstown	Western end of US 422 concurrency; signed as exits 12A (west) and 12B (east) eastbound
Lawrence	Union Township	13.484	21.700		13	US 224 (State Street) – Poland, OH	
Lawrence	Union Township	14.604	23.503	20 (Note: Sequential exit number for PA 60 before replacement with milepost-based exit number); 45 (Note: Milepost-based exit number for PA 60 before redesignation to I-376)	15	US 422 east – Butler	Left exit eastbound; eastern end of US 422 concurrency; last eastbound exit before toll
Lawrence	North Beaver Township	16.28	26.20	19; 43	17	PA 108 – Mt. Jackson	Tolled eastbound exit and westbound entrance
Lawrence	North Beaver Township	18.1	29.1	Mainline West Toll Plaza (E-ZPass or toll-by-plate)			
Lawrence	North Beaver Township	19.96	32.12	18; 40	20	PA 168 – Moravia	Tolled westbound exit and eastbound entrance
Beaver	Big Beaver	25.71	41.38	17; 33	26	I-76 / Penna Turnpike to PA 351 – Ohio, Harrisburg	Exit 10 on I-76 / Turnpike; access to PA 351 via Shenango Road
Beaver	Big Beaver	28.79	46.33	16; 31	29	PA 551 to PA 18 – Beaver Falls	Tolled eastbound exit and westbound entrance
Beaver	Chippewa Township	30.5	49.1	Mainline East Toll Plaza (E-ZPass or toll-by-plate)			
Beaver	Chippewa Township	31.03	49.94	15; 29	31	PA 51 – Chippewa	Last westbound exit before toll
Beaver	Brighton Township	35.982	57.907	14	36	Brighton	
Beaver	Vanport Township	38.203	61.482	13	38	PA 68 – Beaver, Midland	Signed as exits 38A (west) and 38B (east) westbound
Beaver	Ohio River	38.343– 38.677	61.707– 62.245	Vanport Bridge			
Beaver	Potter Township	39.328	63.292	12	39	PA 18 – Monaca, Shippingport	Access to Penn State Beaver Campus and Beaver Valley Mall Boulevard
Beaver	Center Township	41.597	66.944	11	42	Center	
Beaver	Hopewell Township	44.723	71.975	10	45	Aliquippa	
Beaver	Hopewell Township	47.877	77.051	9	48	PA 151 – Hopewell	
Allegheny	Findlay Township	50.139	80.691	8	50	I-376 BL east – Moon	Eastbound exit and westbound entrance; western terminus of I-376 BL; former PA 60 Bus.
Allegheny	Findlay Township	51.405	82.728	8	51	I-376 BL east / Flaugherty Run Road – Moon	Westbound exit and eastbound entrance
Allegheny	Findlay Township	52.209	84.022	7	52	To US 30 – Clinton	
Allegheny	Findlay Township	52.867– 53.627	85.081– 86.304	6	53	PA Turnpike 576 east – Washington, Pittsburgh International Airport	Western terminus and exits 1A-B on PA 576; access to Airport via Airport Boulevard
Allegheny	Findlay Township	56.363	90.707	4	56	McClaren Road	
Allegheny	Moon Township	57.185– 57.895	92.030– 93.173	3	57	I-376 BL west / Orange Belt – Moon	Western end of Orange Belt concurrency; eastern terminus of I-376 BL; former PA 60 Bus.
Allegheny	Moon Township	58.487	94.126	2	58	Montour Run Road	
Allegheny	North Fayette Township	59.471	95.709	1	59	Robinson Town Centre Boulevard	
Allegheny	Robinson Township	59.970– 60.527	96.512– 97.409		60	US 22 west / US 30 west / Orange Belt / PA 60 south – Weirton, Crafton	Signed as exits 60A (west) and 60B (south); eastern end of Orange Belt concurrency; western end of US 22/US 30 concurrency; northern terminus of PA 60
Allegheny	Robinson Township	60.864	97.951		61	Ridge Road	
Allegheny	Robinson–Collier township line	61.998	99.776		62	Yellow Belt (Campbells Run Road)	Westbound exit and eastbound entrance
Allegheny	Robinson Township	63.268– 64.177	101.820– 103.283	1 (Note: Sequential exit number for I-279 before replacement with milepost-based exit number); 1A (Note: Milepost-based exit number for I-279 before redesignation to I-376)	64A	I-79 – Washington, Erie	Exit 59 on I-79
Allegheny	Rosslyn Farms	64.481	103.772	2; 1B	64B	Rosslyn Farms	Westbound exit and eastbound entrance
Allegheny	Carnegie	64.915	104.471			Buses only (West Busway)	Eastbound exit and westbound entrance
Allegheny	Carnegie	65.323	105.127	3; 2	65	PA 50 – Carnegie, Heidelberg	
Allegheny	Green Tree	67.225	108.188	4; 4A	67	PA 121 / Blue Belt – Green Tree, Mount Lebanon, Crafton	Signed for Mount Lebanon eastbound, Crafton westbound
Allegheny	Pittsburgh	67.699	108.951	5; 4B	68	Parkway Center Drive	Westbound exit and eastbound entrance
Allegheny	Pittsburgh	68.372	110.034	6; 5A	69A	US 19 south (Banksville Road) – Mt. Lebanon, Uniontown	Western end of US 19 concurrency; westbound exit and eastbound entrance
Allegheny	Pittsburgh	68.808	110.736	7A; 5B	69B	US 19 Truck south / PA 51 south – Uniontown	Western end of US 19 Truck concurrency; eastbound exit and westbound entrance
Allegheny	Pittsburgh	68.883	110.856	7B; 5C	69C	US 19 north / PA 51 north – West End	Eastern end of US 19 concurrency; eastbound exit and westbound entrance
Allegheny	Pittsburgh	68.952– 69.644	110.967– 112.081	Fort Pitt Tunnel under Mount Washington			
Allegheny	Pittsburgh	69.708	112.184	7; 5C	69C	PA 837 north to PA 51 – West End	Westbound exit and eastbound left entrance
Allegheny	Pittsburgh	69.644– 69.873	112.081– 112.450	Fort Pitt Bridge over the Monongahela River			
Allegheny	Pittsburgh	69.873– 70.029	112.450– 112.701	9; 6B	70A	Boulevard of the Allies / Liberty Avenue – PPG Arena	Eastbound left exit and westbound entrance
Allegheny	Pittsburgh	69.873– 70.029	112.450– 112.701	10; 6C	70B	Fort Duquesne Boulevard – Convention Center, Strip District	Eastbound left exit and westbound entrance
Allegheny	Pittsburgh	69.873– 70.029	112.450– 112.701	1 (Note: Sequential exit number before replacement with milepost-based exit number); 1A (Note: Milepost-based exit number from former western terminus in Downtown Pittsburgh)	70C	I-279 north (US 19 Truck north) – Fort Duquesne Bridge, North Shore	Southern terminus of I-279; eastern end of US 19 Truck concurrency; left exit eastbound
Allegheny	Pittsburgh	70.108	112.828	2; 1B	70D	Stanwix Street	No eastbound exit; left exit and entrance westbound; left entrance eastbound
Allegheny	Pittsburgh	70.508	113.472	3; 1C	71A	Grant Street	Left exit and entrance
Allegheny	Pittsburgh	71.036	114.321	4; 1D	71B	Second Avenue	Westbound exit only
Allegheny	Pittsburgh	71.962	115.812	5; 2A	72A	Forbes Avenue – Oakland	Eastbound exit and westbound entrance
Allegheny	Pittsburgh	72.088	116.014	6; 2B	72B	Boulevard of the Allies (PA 885 north) to I-579 north – Liberty Bridge	No eastbound exit; left entrance eastbound
Allegheny	Pittsburgh	72.742	117.067	7; 3	73	PA 885 (Bates Street) – Glenwood, Oakland	Westbound exit and eastbound entrance; signed as exits 73A (south) and 73B (north)
Allegheny	Pittsburgh	74.371	119.689	8; 5	74	Blue Belt – Squirrel Hill, Homestead	
Allegheny	Pittsburgh	74.618– 75.622	120.086– 121.702	Squirrel Hill Tunnel under Squirrel Hill			
Allegheny	Pittsburgh–Swissvale– Edgewood tripoint	76.554	123.202	9; 7	77	Edgewood, Swissvale	
Allegheny	Wilkinsburg	77.868	125.316	10; 8A	78A	US 30 east – Forest Hills	Eastern end of US 30 concurrency; no westbound exit
Allegheny	Wilkinsburg	77.920	125.400	11; 8B	78B	PA 8 north – Wilkinsburg	Southern terminus of PA 8
Allegheny	Churchill	78.732	126.707	12; 9	79A	Greensburg Pike	Eastbound exit and westbound entrance
Allegheny	Churchill	79.503	127.948	13; 10A	79B	PA 130 – Churchill	Left exit westbound
Allegheny	Churchill	79.934	128.641	14; 10B	80	US 22 Bus. east – Monroeville	Eastbound exit and westbound entrance; western terminus of US 22 Bus.
Allegheny	Churchill–Wilkins Township line	80.407	129.403	15; 11	81	PA 791 north / Yellow Belt – Penn Hills	
Allegheny		81.250	130.759		82	PA Turnpike 43 south	Proposed; future northern terminus of PA Turnpike 43; PA Turnpike 43 exit 68B-C
Allegheny	Monroeville	84.117	135.373	16; 14	84	US 22 Bus. west / PA 48 south / Orange Belt – Monroeville, Plum	Eastbound exit and westbound entrance; signed as exits 84A (south) and 84B (north); US 22 Bus. not signed
Allegheny	Monroeville	84.427	135.872	18; 15	85	I-76 Toll / Penna Turnpike / US 22 Bus. west – Monroeville, Ohio, Harrisburg	Exit 57 on I-76 / Turnpike; exit number not signed westbound; no eastbound access to US 22 Bus.
Allegheny	Monroeville	84.427	135.872	17 (Note: Sequential exit number for I-76 before redesignation to I-376)	–	US 22 east – Murrysville	Continuation east; eastern end of US 22 concurrency
1.000 mi = 1.609 km; 1.000 km = 0.621 mi: Concurrency terminus; Electronic toll collection; Incomplete access; Proposed

== Business loop ==
Interstate 376 Business
- Location: Allegheny County
- Length: 6.26 mi (10.07 km)
- Existed: 2009–present

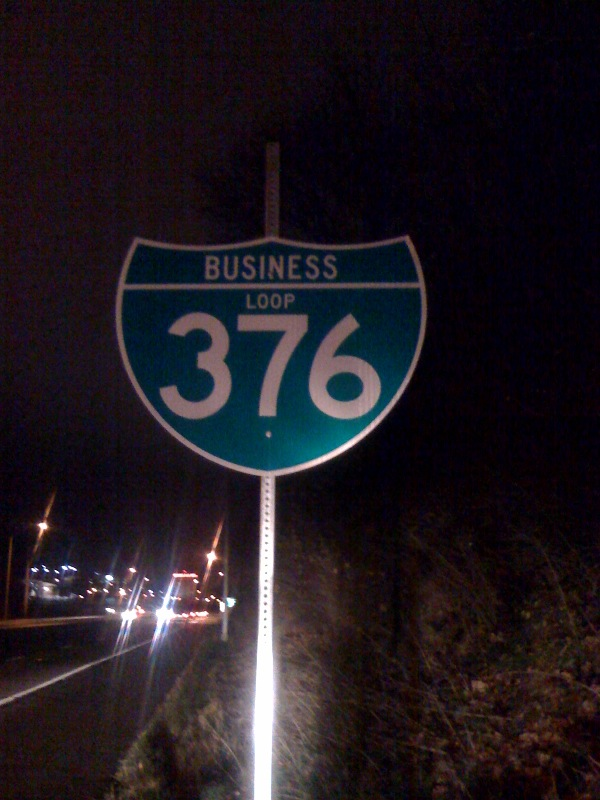
I-376 Bus shield in Moon Township

Interstate 376 Business (I-376 Bus) or Business Loop 376 (BL 376), known locally as the Airport Parkway, is a six-mile (9.7 km) Interstate Highway business loop in Moon Township and Findlay Township in Pennsylvania. Its western terminus is at I-376 and Flaugherty Run Road (exits 50 and 51) north of PIT. Its eastern terminus is at I-376's exit 57, southeast of PIT.

Before November 6, 2009, and after the Southern Expressway was completed in 1992, this road was known as PA 60 Bus. Prior to that, it had the regular PA 60 designation; this was also originally the last leg of the Parkway West which ended at the intersection with then-Beers School Road (now University Boulevard) and began as the Beaver Valley Expressway past the intersection. Much of the road is up to freeway standards, but several signaled at-grade intersections remain, making this multilane divided road a true expressway (unlike many of Pennsylvania's freeways, which are often misleadingly named using the suffix expressway, since they are often called such in the northeast). I-376 Bus is one of only two business Interstate routes found in the commonwealth of Pennsylvania, the other being the business loop of I-83 in York.

== See also ==
- Baltimore and Ohio Station (Pittsburgh)
