= Fort Pitt Tunnel =

Road tunnel in Pittsburgh, Pennsylvania

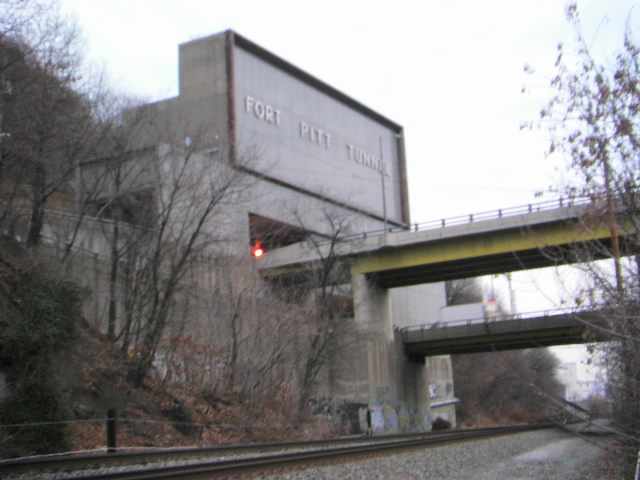
- Northeast Portal of Fort Pitt Tunnel
- Interactive map of Fort Pitt Tunnel

Overview
- Location: Pittsburgh, Pennsylvania
- Coordinates: 40°26′04″N 80°01′08″W
- Route: I-376 / US 19 Truck / US 22 / US 30 (Parkway West)
- Start: I-376 Fort Pitt Bridge
- End: US 19

Operation
- Work began: August 28, 1957
- Constructed: Twin bore, circular roof with an exposed curved ceiling, concrete with ceramic tile lining
- Opened: September 1, 1960
- Owner: PennDOT
- Operator: PennDOT
- Traffic: Automobile
- Toll: none
- Vehicles per day: 107,000

Technical
- Design engineer: Michael Baker, Jr.
- Length: 3,614 feet (1,102 m)
- No. of lanes: 4
- Operating speed: 55 mph (89 km/h)
- Tunnel clearance: 13.5 feet (4.1 m)
- Width: 28 feet (8.5 m)
- Grade: 2.5% (east to west)
- Building details

Design and construction
- Architect: Joseph Bontempo

The Fort Pitt Tunnel is a vehicular tunnel under Mount Washington in Pittsburgh, Pennsylvania. It connects the West End region on the southwest side to the South Shore neighborhood on the northeast side. The adjoining Fort Pitt Bridge on the northeast end connects to Downtown Pittsburgh. The tunnel carries traffic on Interstate 376 (I-376), (Note: Interstate 279 prior to June 10, 2009) U.S. Route 22 (US 22), US 30, and US 19 Truck. The structure comprises two bores, each with two lanes of traffic. The inbound tunnel flows onto the top deck of the double-deck Fort Pitt Bridge, opposite traffic from the lower deck using the outbound tunnel. To accommodate the bridge, the northeast portals of the parallel tunnels are vertically staggered by 30 feet. The tunnel opened in September 1960, a year after the Fort Pitt Bridge.

Before entering the southwest end of the inbound tunnel, travelers see a commonplace view of Southwestern Pennsylvania's hills, but at the northeast end, travelers emerge to a panorama of Downtown Pittsburgh and the surrounding skyline. The view was cited by The New York Times as "the best way to enter an American city". The vantage was the inspiration for the news opening on Pittsburgh's KDKA-TV for several years in the 1980s and 1990s, and is referenced in Stephen Chbosky's novel The Perks of Being a Wallflower.

The Fort Pitt Tunnel is the third-longest automobile tunnel in Pittsburgh, following the Liberty Tunnels and the Squirrel Hill Tunnel. It is one of four major tunnels (Note: Tunnels at least 3500 feet long) passing beneath Mount Washington, including the Liberty Tunnels and the Wabash Tunnel for automobiles, and the Mount Washington Transit Tunnel for public transportation.

== History ==
Before the existence of the Fort Pitt Tunnels (as well as the Penn Lincoln Parkway and West End Bypass), South Hills commuters travelled around the Banksville Circle, which was the northern terminus of Banksville Road and western terminus of Saw Mill Run Blvd at the time. On July 11, 1954, contracts were awarded for the basic design of the Fort Pitt Tunnels. The groundbreaking ceremony for the Fort Pitt tunnel was held April 17, 1957 and drilling began August 28 of the same year. In April 1960 construction on the tunnels was complete and they opened for the first time at 11 a.m. on September 1, 1960, with a dedication ceremony on the southwestern portal by Governor Lawrence, Pennsylvania Transportation Secretary Park H. Martin and Pittsburgh Mayor Joseph M. Barr followed by a "christening" of the tunnels in which the Governor led a caravan of antique cars through. The tunnel cost $17 million (equivalent to $185 million in 2025).

On Thursday, May 31, 2007, a bomb threat shut down the Fort Pitt Tunnel along with the Liberty and Squirrel Hill tunnels, causing a major traffic jam.

The tunnel provided AM reception in 1960, but due to design repairs it was discontinued until 1986. It was improved to cover the entire tunnel with strong reception in March 1997. Since August 1987, the tunnels have provided cellular phone reception. With the help of Carnegie Mellon University graduate students, the tunnel has provided FM reception since July 2005 as well as having its AM signals upgraded at that time. In 2015, the original flat ceiling was removed due to its poor condition.

The tunnel was used as a filming location for the 2012 film The Perks of Being a Wallflower.

== Dimensions and specifications ==
- 3,614 ft (1.102 km) in length
- 28 ft (8.5 m) wide
- 13.5 ft (4.1 m) vertical clearance
- Serves nearly 107,000 vehicles per day.
- There are 1,788 light fixtures with 3,576 bulbs.
- There are 187,200 sq ft (17,390 m^{2}) of tiled surface to wash.
