= U.S. Route 19 Truck (Pittsburgh) =

Highway in Pennsylvania

U.S. Route 19 Truck

Route information
- Auxiliary route of US 19
- Maintained by PennDOT
- Length: 19.4 mi (31.2 km)

Major junctions
- South end: US 19 in Mt. Lebanon
- PA 51 in Pittsburgh; I-376 / US 22 / US 30 in Pittsburgh; PA 65 in Pittsburgh; I-579 / PA 28 in Pittsburgh; I-279 in Pittsburgh
- North end: US 19 in McCandless Township

Location
- Country: United States
- State: Pennsylvania
- Counties: Allegheny

Highway system
- United States Numbered Highway System; List; Special; Divided; Pennsylvania State Route System; Interstate; US; State; Scenic; Legislative

U.S. Route 19 Truck (US 19 Truck) is a truck route of US 19 located in Western Pennsylvania in Greater Pittsburgh that has a length of 19.4 miles (31.2 km). It is a loop off US 19; the southern terminus located in Mt. Lebanon and the northern terminus in McCandless, connecting to US 19 at both ends. The route is notable for a large, unorthodox interchange with the Penn–Lincoln Parkway (Interstate 376 [I-376]/US 22/US 30) just west of the Fort Pitt Tunnel, where the route joins the parkway and forms several wrong-way concurrencies, including one with its own opposing directions. North of Pittsburgh, US 19 Truck is called McKnight Road and south of Pittsburgh it carries West Liberty Avenue and Washington Road.

== Route description ==
=== Southern terminus to five-route concurrency ===
Diagram showing the northbound/southbound US 19 Truck concurrency Northbound lanes Southbound lanes

US 19 Truck begins as US 19 enters Mt. Lebanon along Washington Road. US 19 branches northwest to skirt Mt. Lebanon and Dormont, following Cochran Road, while US 19 Truck stays on Washington Road and continues through the centers of those towns. As US 19 Truck enters the southern parts of Pittsburgh, its name becomes West Liberty Avenue as it passes through the Beechview neighborhood. At the south portal of the Liberty Tunnel, US 19 Truck interchanges with Pennsylvania Route 51 (PA 51; Saw Mill Run Boulevard) and joins it, following it north.

After 1.4 miles (2.3 km), US 19 Truck and PA 51 encounter the Penn–Lincoln Parkway, carrying I-376/US 22/US 30, at a complex, unorthodox interchange complex that stretches roughly half a mile (0.80 km) along the parkway and rests just south of the Fort Pitt Tunnel. Mainline US 19 also resides within this interchange, exiting the parkway and traveling north to join PA 51. Here, US 19 Truck joins the parkway.

Northbound US 19 Truck exits PA 51 at a left exit, turning toward the westbound parkway, which also contains a right-in/right-out ramp for Woodville Avenue. The ramp merges into the southbound US 19 mainline ramp, forming a wrong-way concurrency, but remains separated from the Penn–Lincoln Parkway via a Jersey barrier. The ramp travels for roughly half a mile (0.80 km) in this fashion before making a U-shaped curve. Before this ramp passes under the parkway, it merges with southbound US 19 Truck (which exits the Penn–Lincoln Parkway from the Fort Pitt Tunnel), forming a wrong-way concurrency with itself. Mainline US 19 separates after the underpass and travels southbound as Banksville Road, and the ramp (carrying north and south US 19 Truck) curves northward, joining with the northbound US 19 mainline. The ramp now merges into the Penn–Lincoln Parkway, forming four lanes of I-376/US 22/US 30/both directions of US 19 Truck/US 19. After a short stretch, southbound US 19 Truck exits south at the next ramp, removing one lane from the Parkway, and, after passing under PA 51, northbound mainline US 19 exits as well, also removing a lane. The Penn–Lincoln Parkway, now with both directions carrying I-376/US 22/US 30/US 19 Truck and in an orthodox orientation, enter the Fort Pitt Tunnel.

=== Fort Pitt Tunnel to I-279 Interchange ===
After exiting the Fort Pitt Tunnel, US 19 Truck/I-376/US 22/US 30 cross the Monongahela River on the Fort Pitt Bridge, arriving on the Golden Triangle of Downtown Pittsburgh. The route meets the southern terminus of I-279 here, and I-376/US 22/US 30 head eastward, while US 19 Truck separates from them and joins I-279 on its northward trek. The two routes then cross the Allegheny River on the Fort Duquesne Bridge. North of the bridge, I-279 and US 19 Truck interchange with the southern terminus of PA 65 at exit 1C of I-279. Exit 1B is to PNC Park and exit 1C is for Acrisure Stadium. At exit 1D and 2A, I-279 southbound splits into high-occupancy vehicle (HOV) lanes at the I-279 Interchange. The I-279 interchange involves the northern terminus of I-579 and the southern terminus of PA 28.

=== Exit 2 to northern terminus ===
North of exit 2B, I-279 has HOV lanes and continues its concurrency with US 19 Truck toward the north. At exit 4, US 19 Truck splits from I-279 and US 19 Truck continues toward the north at-grade as McKnight Road, a frequently congested divided highway known locally as McNightmare Road. In Ross Township, US 19 Truck interchanges with Babcock Boulevard and shifts toward the northwest. The remainder of the route widens to six lanes and heavily lined with shopping centers and large malls, including North Hills Village, Ross Park Mall, and McCandless Crossing. In McCandless, US 19 Truck interchanges with Ingomar Road. Northwest of Ingomar Road, US 19 Truck turns west, paralleling and crossing Pine Creek before it terminates (ends) at a partial Y interchange with US 19.

== History ==
The roadway was signed as US 19 from 1941 to 1948. The route was signed in 1946 as a bypass route for trucks that were not allowed on US 19. In 1948, the southern terminus was moved from Banksville Road to its current location. In 1989, US 19 Truck's designation was moved to I-279 to form a complete US 19 Truck from Mt. Lebanon to Wexford after the parkway north was completed. In 1997, construction began on the interchange at the southern portal of the Liberty Tunnel and opened to traffic on November 20, 1999.

== Major intersections ==
The entire route is in Allegheny County.

Location	mi	km	Old exit	New exit	Destinations	Notes
Mt. Lebanon	0.0	0.0			US 19 / Yellow Belt (Washington Road / Cochran Road) – Bethel Park	Southern terminus
Dormont					Blue Belt (Potomac Avenue) – Green Tree	Southern end of Blue Belt concurrency
Dormont					Blue Belt (Pioneer Avenue) – Brentwood	Northern end of Blue Belt concurrency
Pittsburgh					Buses only (South Busway)	Northbound exit and southbound entrance
Pittsburgh					PA 51 south (Saw Mill Run Boulevard) / Liberty Tunnel – Downtown, South Side, Uniontown	Interchange; southern end of PA 51 concurrency
Pittsburgh					To PA 837 – Wabash Tunnel, Mount Washington	Access via Woodruff Street
Pittsburgh			5	69	I-376 west (US 22 west / US 30 west) – Carnegie, Pittsburgh International Airport US 19 north / PA 51 north (Saw Mill Run Boulevard) – West End Bridge, Downtown US 19 south (Banksville Road) – Mt. Lebanon; Woodville Avenue – West End	Northern end of PA 51 concurrency; southern end of I-376/US 22/US 30 concurrency
Pittsburgh			Fort Pitt Tunnel under Mount Washington			
Pittsburgh			5C	69C	PA 837 north to PA 51 – West End	Southbound exit and northbound entrance
Monongahela River			Fort Pitt Bridge			
Pittsburgh			6B	70A	Boulevard of the Allies / Liberty Avenue – PPG Arena	Northbound exit and southbound entrance
Pittsburgh			6C	70B	Fort Duquesne Boulevard – Convention Center, Strip District	Northbound exit and southbound entrance
Pittsburgh			6A	70C	I-376 east (US 22 east / US 30 east) – Monroeville I-279 begins	Northern end of I-376/US 22/US 30 concurrency; southern terminus of I-279; exit number not signed southbound
Pittsburgh			6C	70B (NB); 1A (SB)	Fort Duquesne Boulevard – Convention Center, Strip District	
Allegheny River			Fort Duquesne Bridge			
Pittsburgh			7A	1B	North Shore	No northbound entrance; access to Acrisure Stadium, PNC Park, and Carnegie Science Center
Pittsburgh			7B	1C	PA 65 north (Ohio River Boulevard) to US 19	Left exit and entrance northbound; US 19 not signed southbound; southern terminus of PA 65
Pittsburgh					9th Street	Southbound left exit and northbound entrance
Pittsburgh					I-279 south (US 19 Truck south)	Southbound exit only
Pittsburgh					PPG Arena	Southbound left exit and northbound entrance
Pittsburgh			7C	1D	PA 28 north / Chestnut Street / Ohio Street – Etna	Northbound exit and southbound entrance
Pittsburgh			8A	2A	I-579 south (Veterans Bridge)	Southbound exit and northbound entrance; northern terminus of I-579
Pittsburgh			8B	2B	East Ohio Street to PA 28 north	Southbound exit and northbound entrance
Pittsburgh			9	3	Hazlett Street	Northbound exit and entrance
Pittsburgh			10 11	4	East Street	Southbound exit and entrance
Pittsburgh			10 11	4	I-279 north to I-79 north – Erie	Northern end of I-279 concurrency
Pittsburgh					I-279 south (US 19 Truck south) – Pittsburgh	Southbound left exit and northbound entrance
Pittsburgh					Evergreen Road – Millvale	Northbound access via exit ramp
Pittsburgh					Nelson Run Road to Blue Belt	Interchange
Ross Township					Babcock Boulevard – West View, Millvale	Interchange
McCandless					Green Belt (Babcock Boulevard / Peebles Road) to PA 8 / PA 65 – Hampton Township, Emsworth	
McCandless					Perrymont Road / Babcock Boulevard to US 19 – La Roche University, UPMC Passavant McCandless	
McCandless					Cumberland Road – La Roche University, UPMC Passavant McCandless	
McCandless					Yellow Belt (Ingomar Road) – North Park, Hampton, Franklin Park, Ingomar	Interchange; northbound exit and southbound entrance
McCandless					Pine Creek Road to US 19 south / Rinaman Road	
McCandless					US 19 north (Perry Highway) – Wexford	Northern terminus
1.000 mi = 1.609 km; 1.000 km = 0.621 mi: Concurrency terminus; HOV only; Incomplete access
