= Interstate 376 Business =

Highway in Pennsylvania

Interstate 376 Business
- 99th Infantry Division Memorial Highway
- I-376 Bus. highlighted in red

Route information
- Business route of I-376
- Maintained by PennDOT
- Length: 6.88 mi (11.07 km)
- Existed: 2009–present
- History: Replaced PA 60 Bus. in 2009

Major junctions
- West end: I-376 in Findlay Township
- Orange Belt in Moon Township
- East end: I-376 / Orange Belt in Moon Township

Location
- Country: United States
- State: Pennsylvania
- Counties: Allegheny

Highway system
- Interstate Highway System; Main; Auxiliary; Suffixed; Business; Future; Pennsylvania State Route System; Interstate; US; State; Scenic; Legislative

Interstate 376 Business (I-376 Bus.), commonly referred to as Business Loop 376 or simply Business 376, is a 6.88-mile-long (11.07 km) limited-access business loop of I-376 that is located in Allegheny County, Pennsylvania in the United States. It is situated almost entirely within Moon Township and serves both the township and the cargo and services areas of Pittsburgh International Airport.

The road is part of the Beaver Valley Expressway, stretching from its western terminus to University Boulevard and part of the Airport Parkway from University Boulevard to its eastern terminus. It is officially known, for its entire length, as the 99th Infantry Division Memorial Highway.

One of only two business loops of an Interstate Highway in the Commonwealth of Pennsylvania, the other being I-83 Bus., this route was originally part of Pennsylvania Route 60 (PA 60) before becoming Pennsylvania Route 60 Business (PA 60 Bus.) in 1992. In 2009, PA 60 was truncated to its current northern terminus as I-376 was extended in its place to Hermitage, causing the route to be redesignated as I-376 Bus.

Although this interstate is primarily a freeway, a short section in the middle of its route is an expressway with signalized at-grade intersections.

== Route description ==
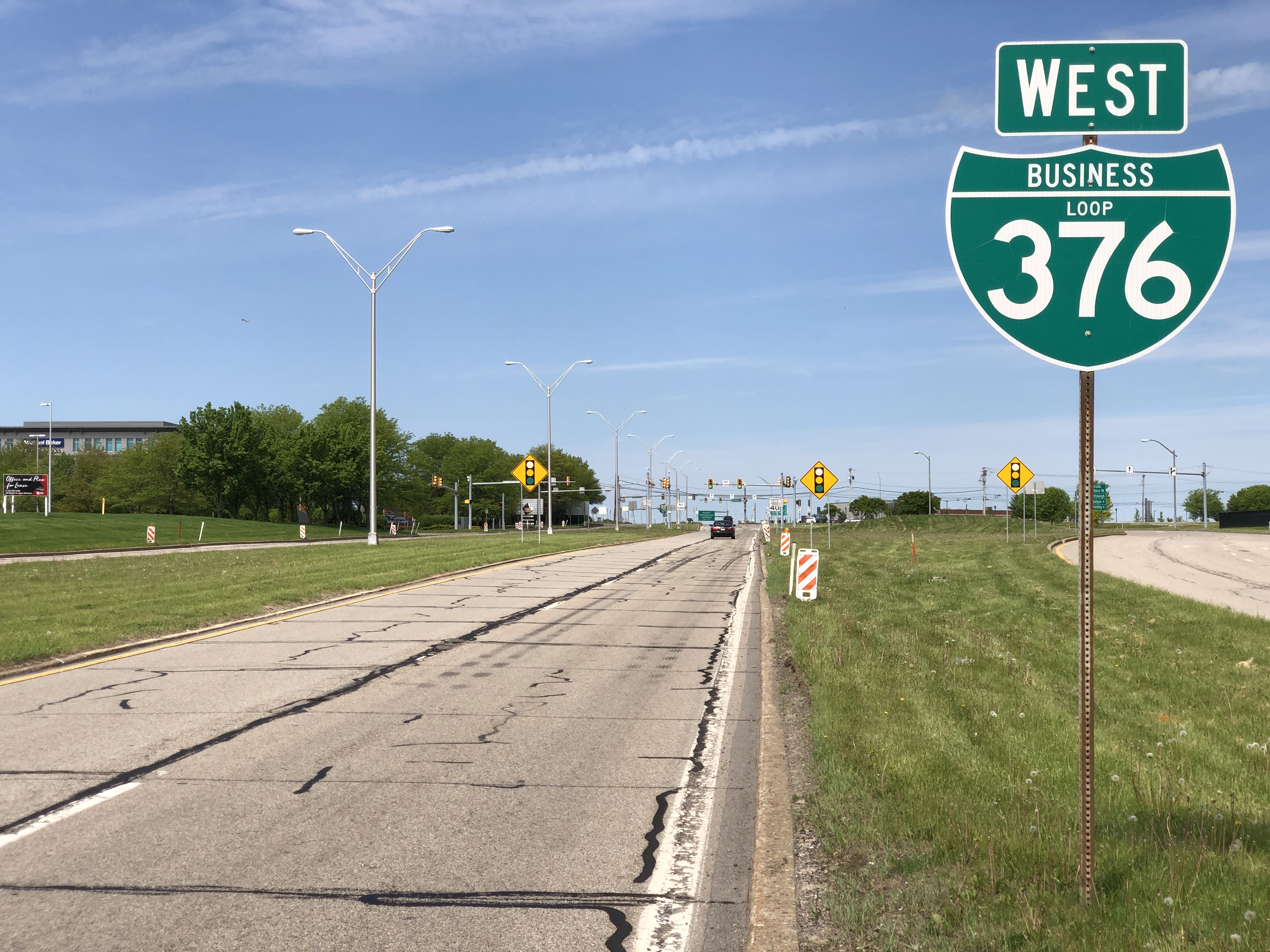
I-376 Bus. westbound approaching University Boulevard in Moon Township

I-376 Bus. diverges from I-376 at a partial interchange in Findlay Township, heading due south as a continuation of the Beaver Valley Expressway with a wide grass median. The road immediately turns east, meeting Flaugherty Run Road at a diamond interchange which allows indirect access to the remaining movements for I-376. Heading east, I-376 Bus. comes to a diamond interchange with International Drive, which provides access to three of the cargo areas of Pittsburgh International Airport. Further east, the median narrows and the road curves southeast before coming to a signalized intersection with Hangar Road, which connects to the airport service area, marking the end of the Beaver Valley Expressway.

I-376 Bus. turns east again as a four-lane, at-grade limited-access road before intersecting University Boulevard to the north and Horizon Drive to the south. This intersection is the beginning of the Airport Parkway, at which point a wide grass median begins again. The third and final signalized intersection on the route is with Airside Drive, leading to more of the airport's cargo areas. The median narrows again as I-376 Bus. curves south-southeast as a freeway once again. The road intersects Thorn Run Road and then Ewing Road before ending at I-376. The Airport Parkway name continues onto I-376 to the east.

== History ==
The Airport Parkway section of the route was built in the early 1950s as a four-lane, at-grade limited-access road connecting what was then Beers School Road (today University Boulevard) at the former Pittsburgh International Airport terminals to McClaren Road at the site of the current eastern terminus of the route. In 1962, the road became part of an extended PA 60, which continued north along what is now University Boulevard to PA 51.

Construction began in the late 1960s on the Beaver Valley Expressway section of the road, which opened by 1971. At the time, the freeway abruptly ended at a stub just east of the current International Drive interchange. Traffic was diverted off the mainline onto a temporary connector road which fed into the current at-grade four-lane divided portion of the route. Original plans called for the Beaver Valley Expressway to be extended east to directly connect to the freeway portion of the Airport Parkway. This plan was canceled in the 1970s, causing a short gap in the freeway portion of PA 60.

Pennsylvania Route 60 Business
- Location: Moon Township–Findlay Township
- Length: 6.88 mi (11.07 km)
- Existed: 1992–2009

In 1992, the Southern Expressway opened, connecting to the new Pittsburgh International Airport terminal. The PA 60 designation was rerouted onto it, creating PA 60 Bus. in its place.

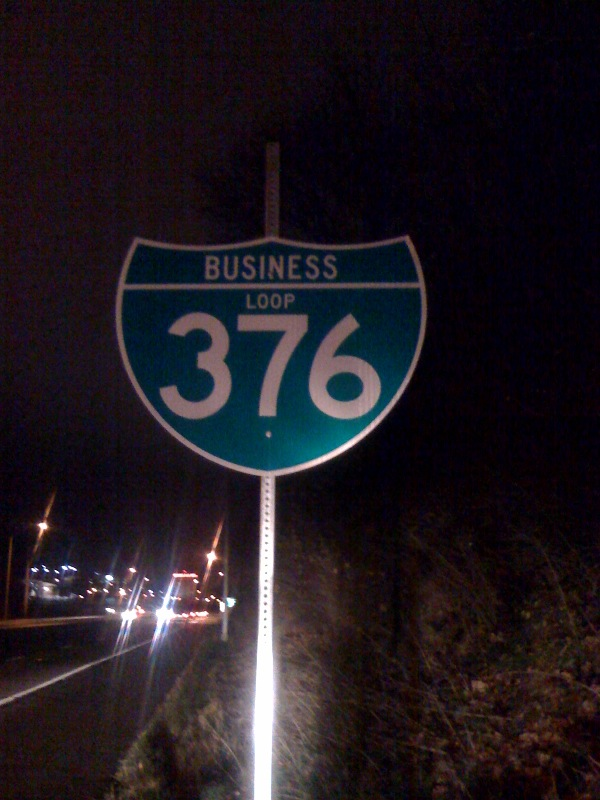
I-376 Bus. shield in Moon Township

In order to increase the accessibility of the cargo areas, International Drive was built, and with it came a new interchange. The project also involved reconstructing the road to the east of the interchange, removing the stub of the canceled Beaver Valley Expressway extension and improving the transition from freeway to limited-access highway. Construction began in 2001 and finished in 2003.

I-376 was extended to I-80 near Hermitage in 2009, and PA 60 was cut back to its current northern terminus. As a result, PA 60 Bus. was decommissioned and replaced with I-376 Bus.

== Exit list ==
The entire route is in Allegheny County. All exits are unnumbered.

Location	mi	km	Destinations	Notes
Findlay Township	0.00	0.00	I-376 west – Beaver	Western terminus; exit 50 on I-376
Findlay Township–Moon Township line	1.13	1.82	I-376 east / Flaugherty Run Road – Pittsburgh International Airport	I-376 not signed eastbound; exit 51 on I-376
Moon Township	2.21	3.56	International Drive	Access to cargo areas 1, 2, and 3
Moon Township	2.99	4.81	Halverson Drive	Eastbound entrance only
Moon Township	3.62	5.83	Eastern end of freeway section	
Moon Township	3.62	5.83	Hangar Service Road	At-grade intersection; access to airport service area and airport maintenance facilities
Moon Township	3.87	6.23	Orange Belt (University Boulevard) / Horizon Drive to PA 51 – Sewickley, Coraopolis, Robert Morris University	At-grade intersection; western end of Orange Belt concurrency
Moon Township	4.02	6.47	Airside Drive	At-grade intersection with jughandle; access to Airside Business Park and cargo areas A and B
Moon Township	4.02	6.47	Western end of freeway section	
Moon Township	4.59	7.39	Thorn Run Road – Sewickley, Coraopolis, Pittsburgh IAP Air Reserve Station	Access to Airport Office Park
Moon Township	5.82	9.37	Ewing Road – Coraopolis	
Moon Township	6.88	11.07	I-376 / Orange Belt to PA Turnpike 576 east / Montour Run Road – Pittsburgh, Pittsburgh International Airport	Eastern terminus; eastern end of Orange Belt concurrency; exit 57 on I-376
1.000 mi = 1.609 km; 1.000 km = 0.621 mi: Concurrency terminus; Incomplete access
