= Pennsylvania Route 60 =

State highway in Allegheny County, Pennsylvania, US

Pennsylvania Route 60
- Map of the Pittsburgh area with PA 60 highlighted in red

Route information
- Maintained by PennDOT
- Length: 9.400 mi (15.128 km)
- Existed: January 1956–present

Major junctions
- South end: US 19 / PA 51 / PA 837 in Pittsburgh
- I-79 in Robinson Township
- North end: I-376 / US 22 / US 30 / Orange Belt in Robinson Township

Location
- Country: United States
- State: Pennsylvania
- Counties: Allegheny

Highway system
- Pennsylvania State Route System; Interstate; US; State; Scenic; Legislative
← PA 59	→ PA 61

Pennsylvania Route 60 (PA 60) is a state highway located in the western suburbs of Pittsburgh, Pennsylvania. Although the route follows a mostly east–west alignment, it is signed as a north–south highway. The southern terminus of the route is at a partial interchange with U.S. Route 19 (US 19) and PA 51 in Pittsburgh's West End while the northern terminus is at an interchange with Interstate 376 (I-376), US 22, and US 30 in Robinson Township. The portion of PA 60 outside of Pittsburgh is known as the Steubenville Pike; within the city, PA 60 follows several different streets.

The routing of PA 60 was originally designated as part of US 22 and US 30 in the 1920s. In 1953, US 22 and US 30 were rerouted to follow a new highway to the south while the former routing of the two routes through Crafton became PA 60 in January 1956. The PA 60 designation was gradually extended northward as sections of the Airport Parkway and the Beaver Valley Expressway were built in the 1960s and 1970s, with the route eventually extending as far northward as US 62 Business in Sharon. For years, a gap existed in PA 60 between West Mayfield and New Castle; it was filled on November 20, 1992, with the opening of a toll road between the two locations.

In 2005, it was announced that the part of PA 60 between Robinson Township and the Pennsylvania Turnpike in Beaver County would become part of an extended I-376 in 2009. The changeover officially occurred on November 6, 2009, with I-376 extending farther northward to I-80 near Sharon. PA 60 was truncated back to its original terminus at US 22 and US 30 in Robinson Township while the portion of former PA 60 north of I-80 in Sharon became PA 760. Lastly, the business route of PA 60 around the northern part of Pittsburgh International Airport near Moon became I-376 Business.

== Route description ==
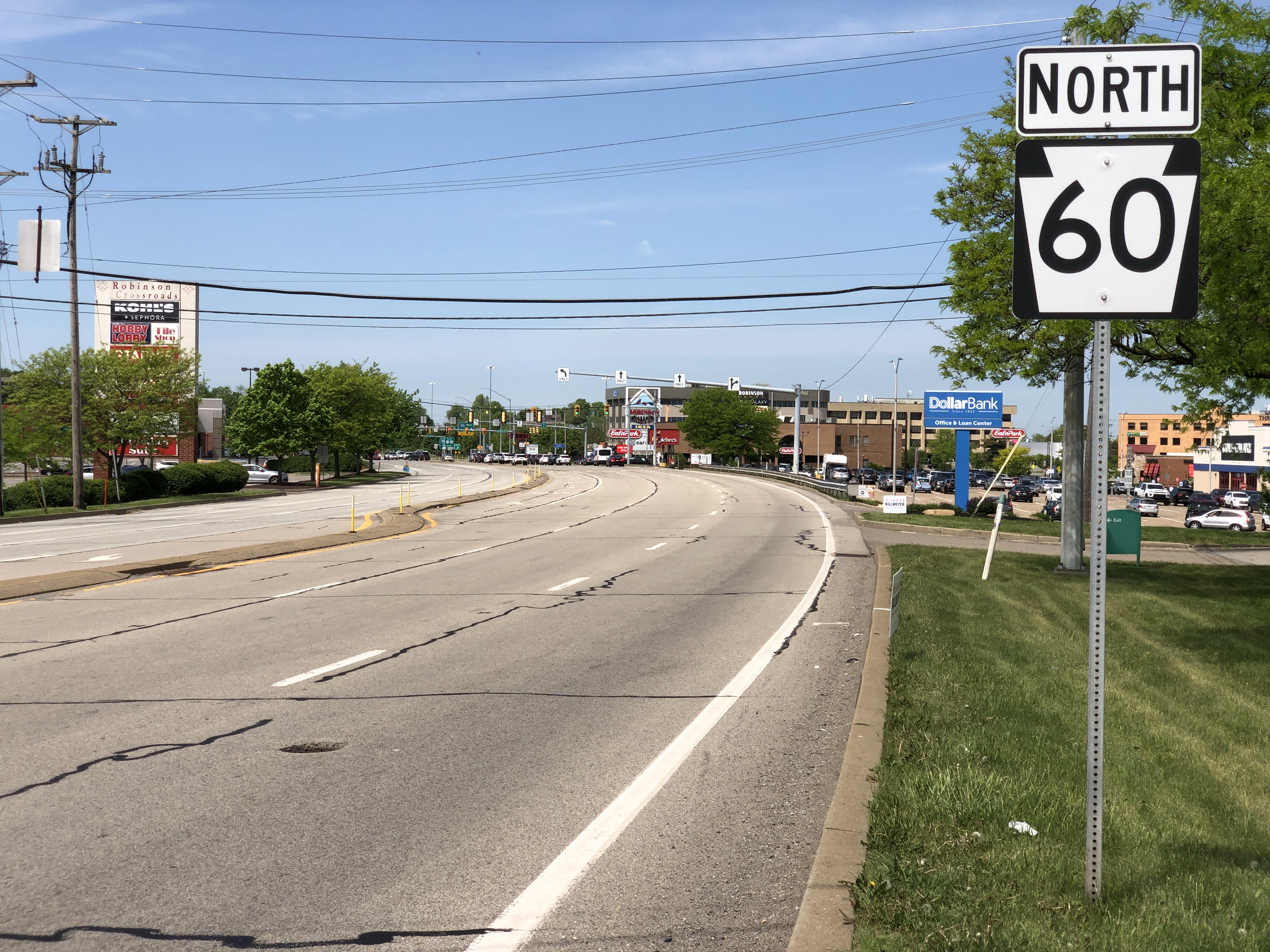
PA 60 northbound in Robinson Township

PA 60 begins in the West End of the city of Pittsburgh at a complex intersection with US 19 and PA 51 that also serves as the northern terminus of PA 837. It heads southwestward along South Main Street through the West End before curving to the south and following Noblestown Road south and west around the Elliott neighborhood. The route continues into Crafton Heights, where it meets the eastern terminus of PA 50. Here, the Noblestown Road name follows PA 50 to the south while PA 60 heads westward as Crafton Boulevard into the borough of Crafton. Just inside the borough, the route makes a sharp turn to the south, generally paralleling the borough limits to the intersection of Crafton Boulevard and Dinsmore Avenue.

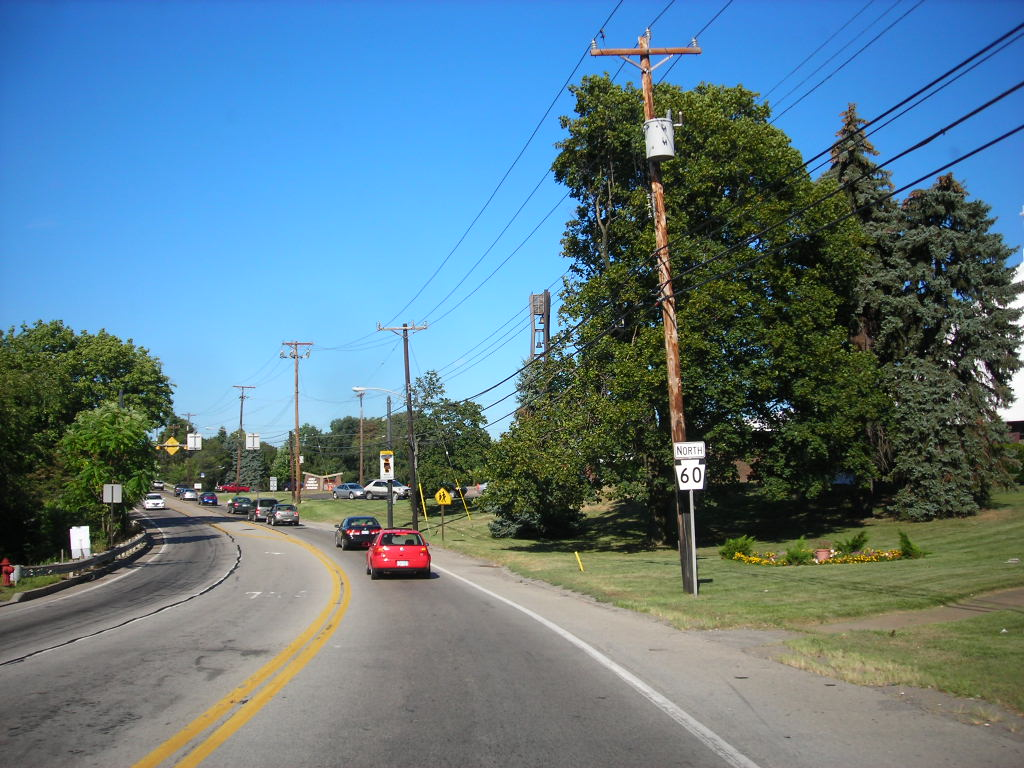
Northbound on PA 60 in Robinson Township

At this point, northbound and southbound PA 60 splits for about 0.5 miles (0.8 km), with PA 60 North following Dinsmore and Noble Avenues northward through a densely populated residential area to East Steuben Street. The route turns west here, rejoining the northbound half of traffic five blocks later at West Crafton Avenue. PA 60 South, meanwhile, is routed on West Crafton and Crennell Avenues through an underpass with the PRT's West Busway to a traffic circle with Stotz Avenue, where it turns right to follow Stotz Avenue for one block to Bradford Avenue. The route veers southward here, remaining on Bradford Avenue to a junction with Crafton Boulevard, where it rejoins opposing traffic. In this area, northbound PA 60 is concurrent with the Blue Belt along Noble Avenue, while southbound PA 60, traveling along Bradford Avenue, crosses the Blue Belt.

Once again a two-direction highway, PA 60 heads westward through a more open but still developed area of Crafton before exiting the borough upon crossing over Chartiers Creek and a Pittsburgh and Ohio Central Railroad line. Now in Robinson Township, PA 60 becomes known as Steubenville Pike as it heads generally westward through a mountainous, lightly developed portion of the township. The amount of development around the route increases as it approaches I-79, which PA 60 meets at exit 60. At this point, the Yellow Belt joins PA 60 as the route heads generally westward through a narrow but extensive commercial and residential neighborhood developed around the highway. As the route enters the vicinity of I-376, US 22, and US 30, the valley widens and the homes and small commercial developments give way to larger establishments and stores. PA 60 continues on past them to an interchange with the aforementioned three routes, where PA 60 terminates.

== History ==
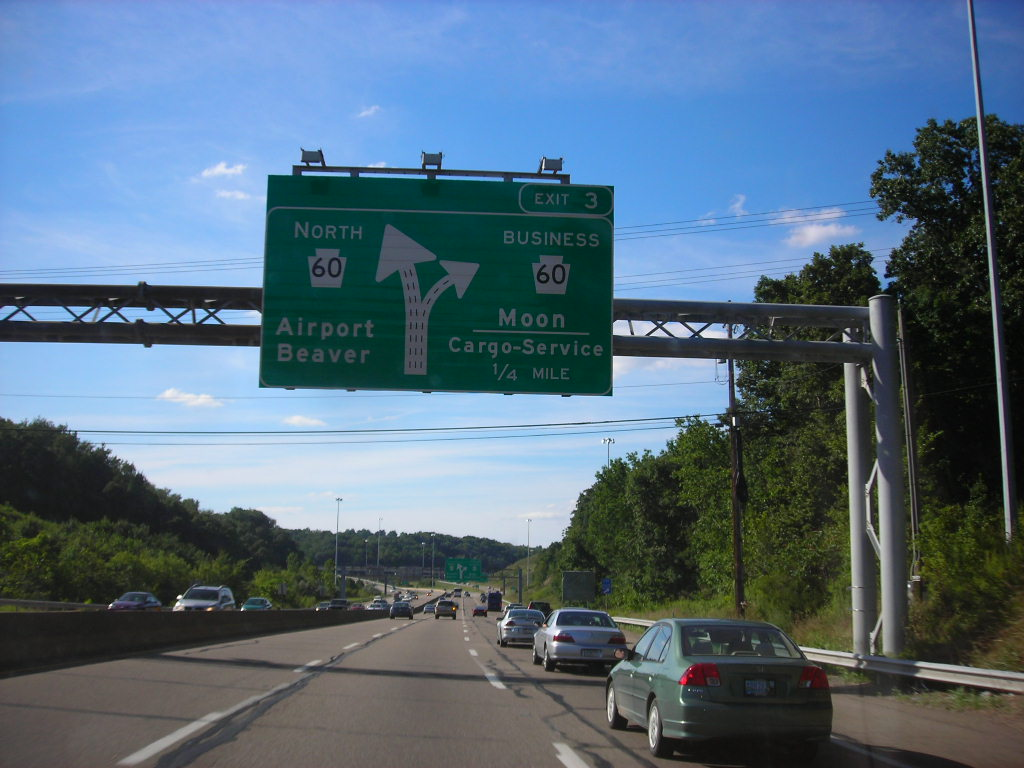
2006 photo of PA 60 northbound approaching the south end of PA 60 Business. In 2009, this section of PA 60 became I-376 and PA 60 Business became I-376 Business.

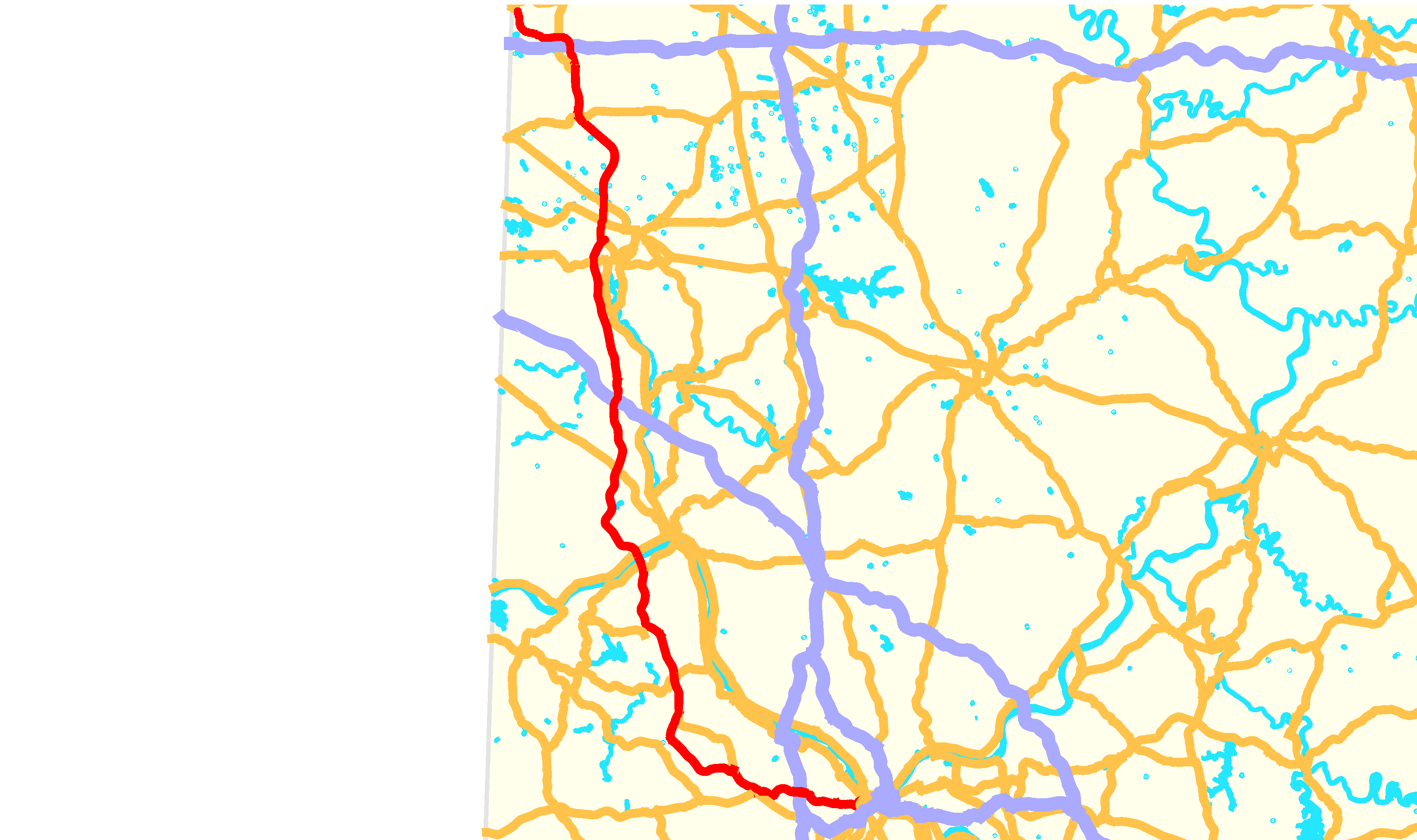
Former route of PA 60 before the extension of I-376

The entirety of modern PA 60 was originally designated as part of US 22 and US 30 in the 1920s. In 1953, US 22 and US 30 were realigned to follow the Penn-Lincoln Parkway West between Robinson Township and Pittsburgh's West End that bypassed south of Crafton, leaving the former alignment unnumbered and without a name. The lack of a route number affected businesses along the road as they could not give directions and led to a decline in business. The former alignment of US 22 and US 30 through Crafton became PA 60 in January 1956. By 1960, a new highway was constructed between the Orange Belt north of Pittsburgh International Airport near Carnot/Moon Township and the junction of US 22, US 30, and PA 60 in Robinson Township. The new road became part of an extended PA 60 in 1962. At the end of the highway, PA 60 followed the Orange Belt north to Carnot, where it met PA 51.

Pennsylvania Route 60 Toll
- Location: Pittsburgh Int'l Airport - Sharon
- Existed: 1991–2009
- History: Predecessor to 2009 I-376 extension.

Construction began in the 1960s on the Beaver Valley Expressway, a north–south freeway extending from Pittsburgh International Airport to Sharon via New Castle. By 1970, the highway was completed and opened to traffic near West Middlesex and Beaver. The segment of the freeway between Clinton Road northwest of the airport and Beaver was completed by the following year. PA 60 was rerouted and extended northward over the freeway to modern exit 36 by 1973. The remainder of the freeway south of what is now exit 31 was complete by 1980, resulting in another extension of PA 60. Also completed by this time was the New Castle – Sharon segment of the highway, which was also designated as PA 60 upon opening. At the time, PA 60 ended at Interstate 80 while a short extension of the expressway to PA 718 south of Sharon was designated but not signed as State Route 3004 (SR 3004). PA 60 was extended northward over SR 3004 to PA 18 at some point between 1990 and 1997 and northwestward along SR 3004 and PA 718 to US 62 Business in Sharon at some point between 1997 and 2004.

Pennsylvania Route 60 Business
- Location: Moon Township – Findlay Township
- Length: 6.26 mi (10.07 km)
- Existed: 1992–2009

The 16.5-mile (26.6 km) gap in the highway, and thus PA 60, between West Mayfield and New Castle went unfilled for almost a decade. On October 20, 1989, ground was broken on a bridge over the Mahoning River in Lawrence County, marking the start of a $260 million project to complete the missing link in the freeway. The highway, built by the Pennsylvania Turnpike Commission as a toll road, opened to traffic on November 20, 1992. Meanwhile, ground was broken August 27, 1990, on the Southern Expressway, a $190 million, 7.5-mile (12.1 km) highway built to serve a new terminal at Pittsburgh International Airport. The new highway began at the Beaver Valley Expressway northwest of the airport and followed the western and southern edges of the airport to meet the Penn-Lincoln Parkway in Robinson Township. It was opened to traffic as the Airport Expressway on September 9, 1992. PA 60 was realigned to follow the new highway around the southwestern edge of the airport while its former routing around the northeastern edge became PA 60 Business.

On October 17, 2005, U.S. Senator Rick Santorum and U.S. Representative Melissa Hart announced that the Interstate 376 designation would be extended westward over Interstate 279, US 22, US 30, and northward over PA 60 to a new terminus at the Pennsylvania Turnpike near Beaver Falls in 2009. I-376 replaced I-279 (along Parkway West) on June 10, 2009. It was extended again on November 6, 2009, to Interstate 80 near Sharon, overlapping US 22 and US 30 along the Parkway West and replacing PA 60 from Steubenville Pike north to I-80. PA 60 was truncated to its junction with US 22 and US 30 as a result. The former routing of PA 60 in the vicinity of Sharon became PA 760 while PA 60 Business became I-376 Business. On August 1, 2010, signage along the former Turnpike 60 was officially changed to I-376.

== Major intersections ==
The entire route is in Allegheny County.

Location	mi	km	Destinations	Notes
Pittsburgh	0.00	0.00	US 19 / PA 51 / PA 837 south to I-279 north / I-376 – Pittsburgh International Airport, West End Bridge, West End, North Shore, Downtown, Station Square	Southern terminus; northern terminus of PA 837
Pittsburgh	1.78	2.86	PA 50 west (Noblestown Road) – Noblestown, Carnegie	Eastern terminus of PA 50
Crafton	2.62	4.22	Blue Belt (Noble Avenue) – Green Tree, Carnegie	Southern end of Blue Belt concurrency northbound
Crafton	3.26	5.25	Blue Belt (East Steuben Street) – McKees Rocks	Northern end of Blue Belt concurrency northbound
Robinson Township	6.07	9.77	I-79 – Washington, Coraopolis, Erie	Exits 60A-B on I-79
Robinson Township	7.38	11.88	Yellow Belt (Beaver Grade Road) – Coraopolis	Southern end of Yellow Belt concurrency
Robinson Township	8.98	14.45	Yellow Belt (Campbells Run Road) – Carnegie	Northern end of Yellow Belt concurrency
Robinson Township	9.22	14.84	Robinson Center Drive – Robinson Town Centre, The Mall at Robinson	
Robinson Township	9.40	15.13	I-376 / US 22 / US 30 / Orange Belt – Pittsburgh International Airport, Pittsburgh, Weirton	Northern terminus; exit 60B on I-376
1.000 mi = 1.609 km; 1.000 km = 0.621 mi: Concurrency terminus

== PA 60 Truck ==
Pennsylvania Route 60 Truck
- Location: Allegheny County

Pennsylvania Route 60 Truck is a truck route bypassing the narrow segments and dangerous S-curves along mainline PA 60 that are unsafe for larger vehicles. The route begins at the I-376/I-79 interchange and continues north along I-79 to mainline PA 60. It follows I-79 for its entire length.
