= Vanport Bridge =

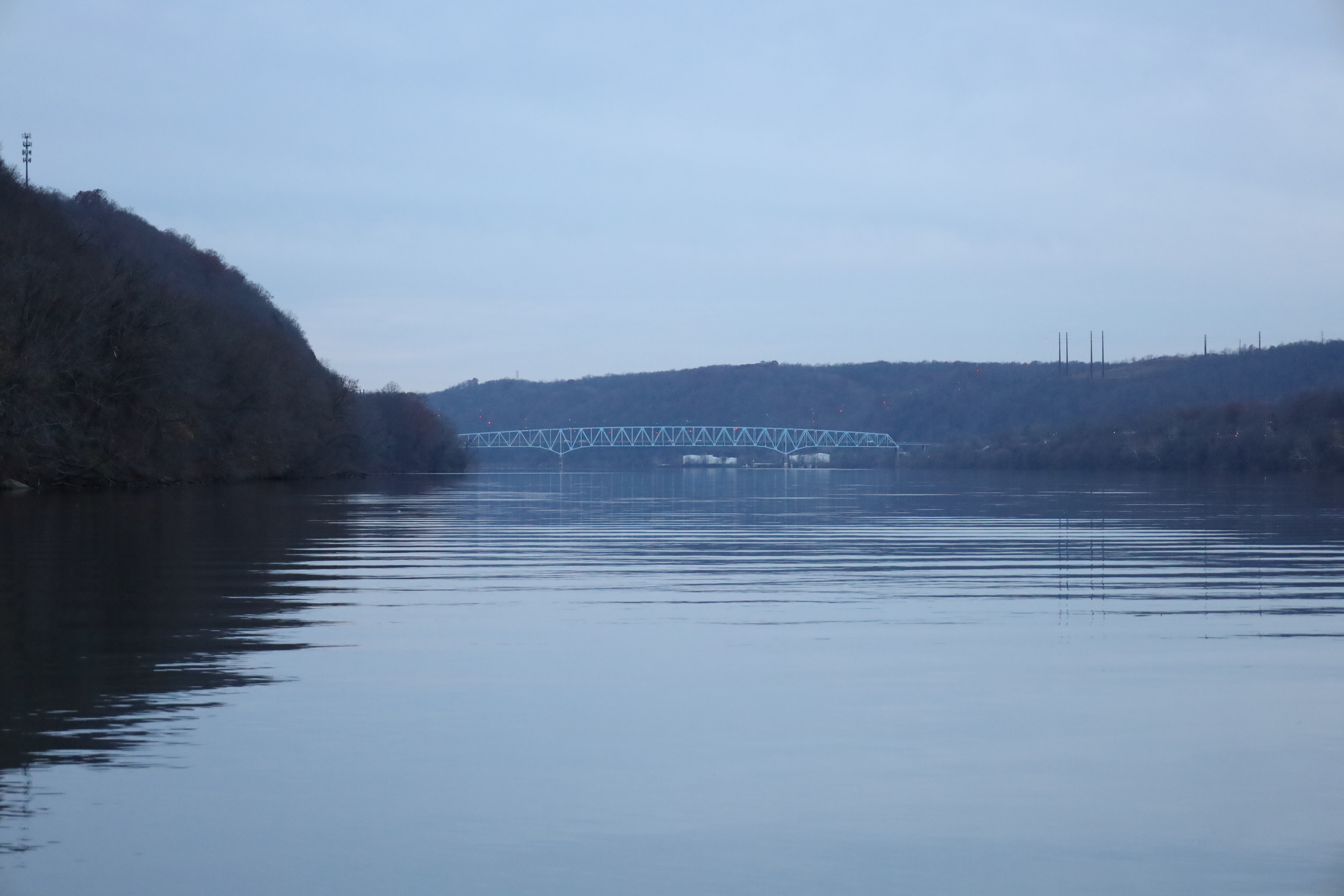
- The bridge in 2025
- Coordinates: 40°40′45″N 80°19′53″W
- Carries: 4 lanes of I-376
- Crosses: Ohio River
- Locale: Vanport Township, Pennsylvania
- Maintained by: PennDOT

Characteristics
- Design: Continuous truss bridge
- Longest span: 220 m

History
- Opened: 1968

Location
- Interactive map of Vanport Bridge

The Vanport Bridge is a four-lane continuous truss bridge that carries Interstate 376 across the Ohio River in Beaver County, Pennsylvania, United States.

== History and notable features ==
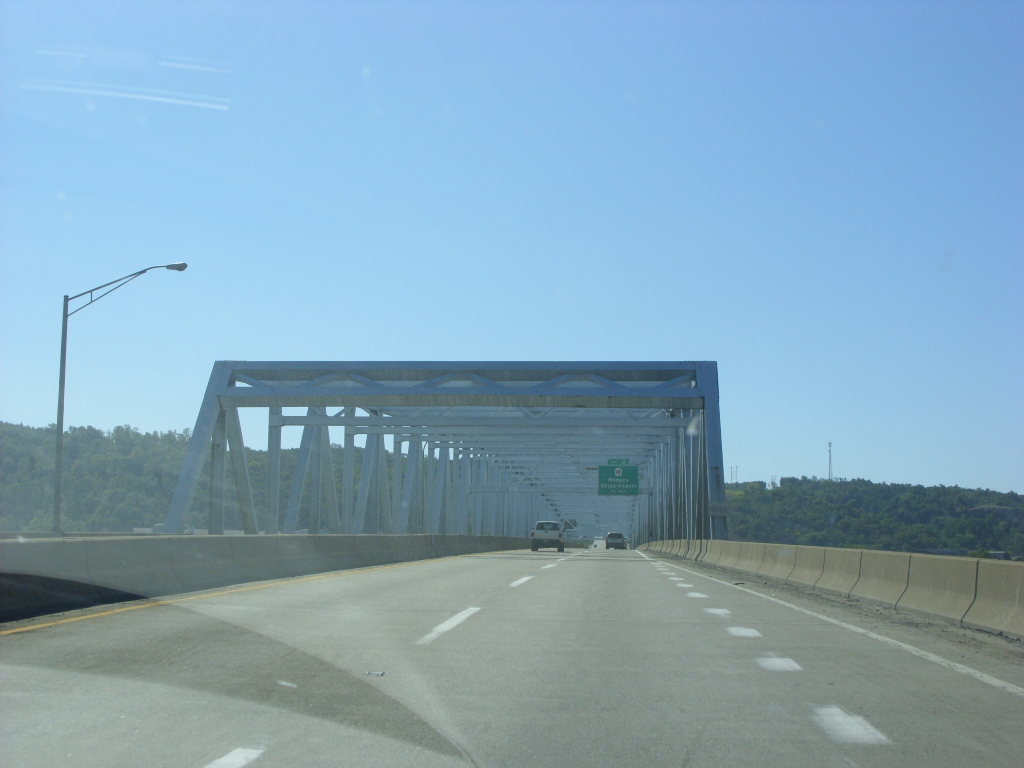
Deck of the bridge in 2008

A total of $10,476,268 was spent on construction of the 1,762-foot bridge over the Ohio River connecting Vanport and Potter townships, which was opened to traffic on December 23, 1968. As a vital part of the Beaver Valley Expressway it was carrying approximately 30,000 vehicles daily in 1990.

In January 1990, the bridge was closed for three days after corrosion and fourteen cracks in welds were discovered during a routine Pennsylvania Department of Transportation (PennDOT) inspection. The cracks ranged in size from seven to thirty-four inches. Damage was located in the bottom truss plate that held the steel box beam in the central span. Passenger traffic was rerouted to the Rochester–Monaca Bridge; trucks — to the Shippingport Bridge. The Vanport Bridge remained restricted to traffic until October 2001, when an out of control apple truck crashed into a crew of carpenters, killing five. It reopened shortly after.

== See also ==
- List of crossings of the Ohio River
