= Vanport Township, Pennsylvania =

Township in Pennsylvania, US

- Township
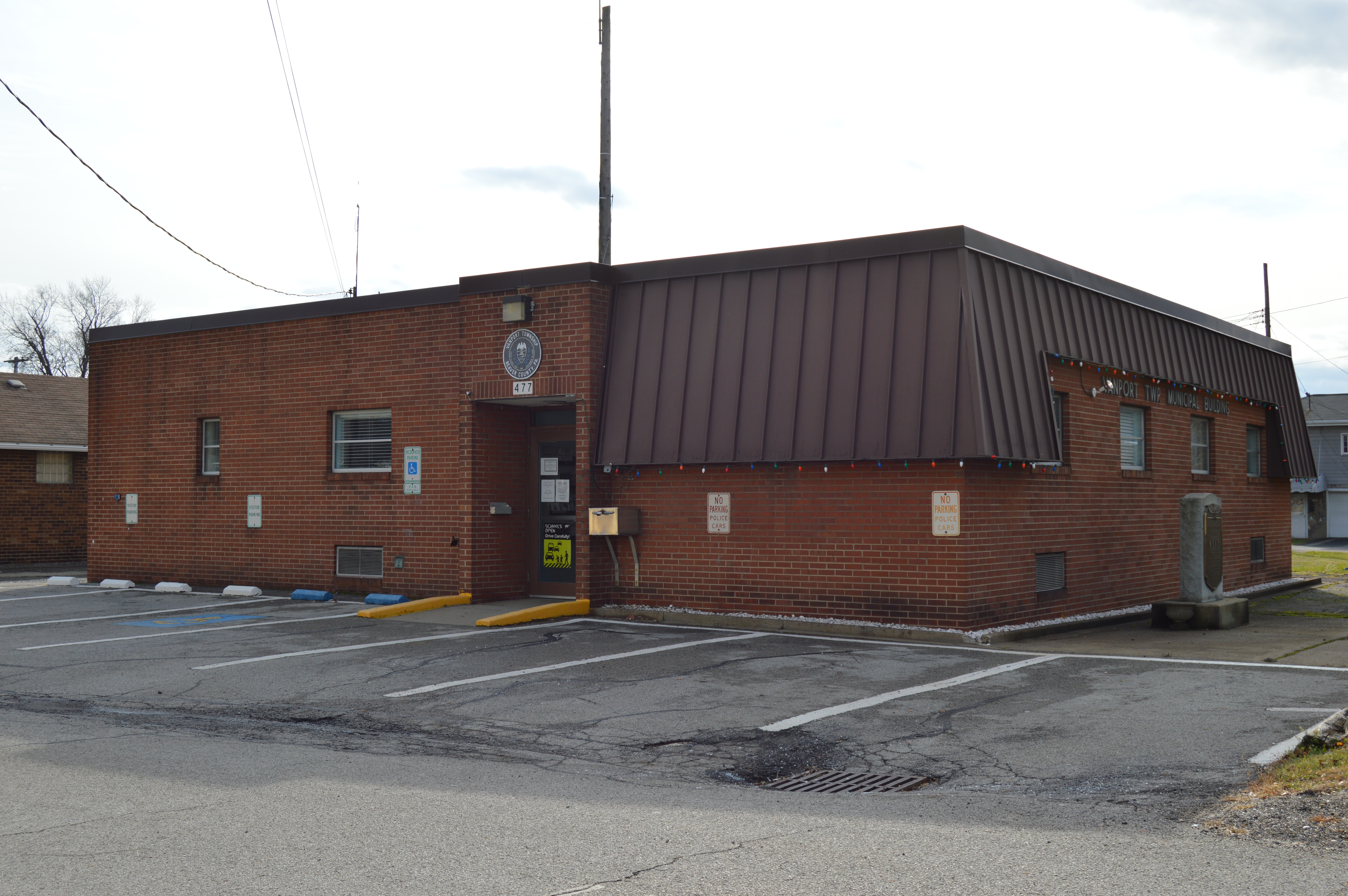
- Township municipal building

- Location in Beaver County and state of Pennsylvania
- Coordinates: 40°41′21″N 80°19′11″W
- Country: United States
- State: Pennsylvania
- County: Beaver
- Incorporated: 1804

Area
  - Total: 1.20 sq mi (3.10 km^{2})
  - Land: 0.92 sq mi (2.37 km^{2})
  - Water: 0.28 sq mi (0.73 km^{2})

Population (2020)
  - Total: 1,289 ▼
  - Estimate (2021): 1,273
  - Density: 1,403.7/sq mi (541.98/km^{2})
- Time zone: UTC-5 (Eastern (EST))
  - Summer (DST): UTC-4 (EDT)
- FIPS code: 42-007-79856
- Website: www.vanporttwp.com

Vanport Township is a township that is located in Beaver County, Pennsylvania, United States, located along the Ohio River. The population was 1,289 at the time of the 2020 census. It is part of the Pittsburgh metropolitan area. It was originally incorporated as Borough Township in 1804, and was renamed to Vanport Township in 1970.

According to the United States Census Bureau, the township has a total area of 1.2 square miles (3.1 km^{2}), of which 0.93 square miles (2.4 km^{2}) is land and 0.27 square miles (0.7 km^{2}), or 23.45%, is water.

== Surrounding neighborhoods ==
Vanport Township has three land borders with Brighton Township to the north, west and northwest, Beaver to the northeast, and Industry to the southwest.

Across the Ohio River to the south, Vanport Township runs adjacent with Potter Township with a direct connector via Vanport Bridge on the Beaver Valley Expressway I-376.

== Demographics ==
Historical population
Census	Pop.	Note	%±
1970	2,122		—
1980	2,013		−5.1%
1990	1,700		−15.5%
2000	1,451		−14.6%
2010	1,321		−9.0%
2020	1,289		−2.4%
2021 (est.)	1,273		−1.2%
U.S. Decennial Census

As of the 2000 census, there were 1,451 people, 775 households, and 422 families residing in the township.

The population density was 1,551.2 inhabitants per square mile (598.9/km^{2}). There were 827 housing units at an average density of 884.1 per square mile (341.4/km^{2}).

The racial makeup of the township was 98.07% White, 1.38% African American, 0.14% Asian, and 0.41% from two or more races. Hispanic or Latino of any race were 0.48% of the population.

There were 775 households, out of which 12.8% had children who were under the age of 18 living with them, 43.6% were married couples living together, 9.2% had a female householder with no husband present, and 45.5% were non-families. Individuals made up 44.0% of all households; 27.7% of those household had someone living alone who was 65 years of age or older.

The average household size was 1.87 and the average family size was 2.55.

Within the township, the population was spread out, with 12.5% under the age of 18, 5.2% from 18 to 24, 20.1% from 25 to 44, 26.7% from 45 to 64, and 35.4% who were 65 years of age or older. The median age was 55 years.

For every 100 females, there were 75.0 males. For every 100 females age 18 and over, there were 69.7 males.

The median income for a household in the township was $26,993, and the median income for a family was $39,688. Males had a median income of $35,408 compared with that of $25,688 for females.

The per capita income for the township was $19,088.

Approximately 1.9% of families and 3.8% of the population were living below the poverty line, including 5.0% of those who were under the age of 18 and 4.1% of those who were aged 65 or older.
