= Fort Duquesne Bridge =

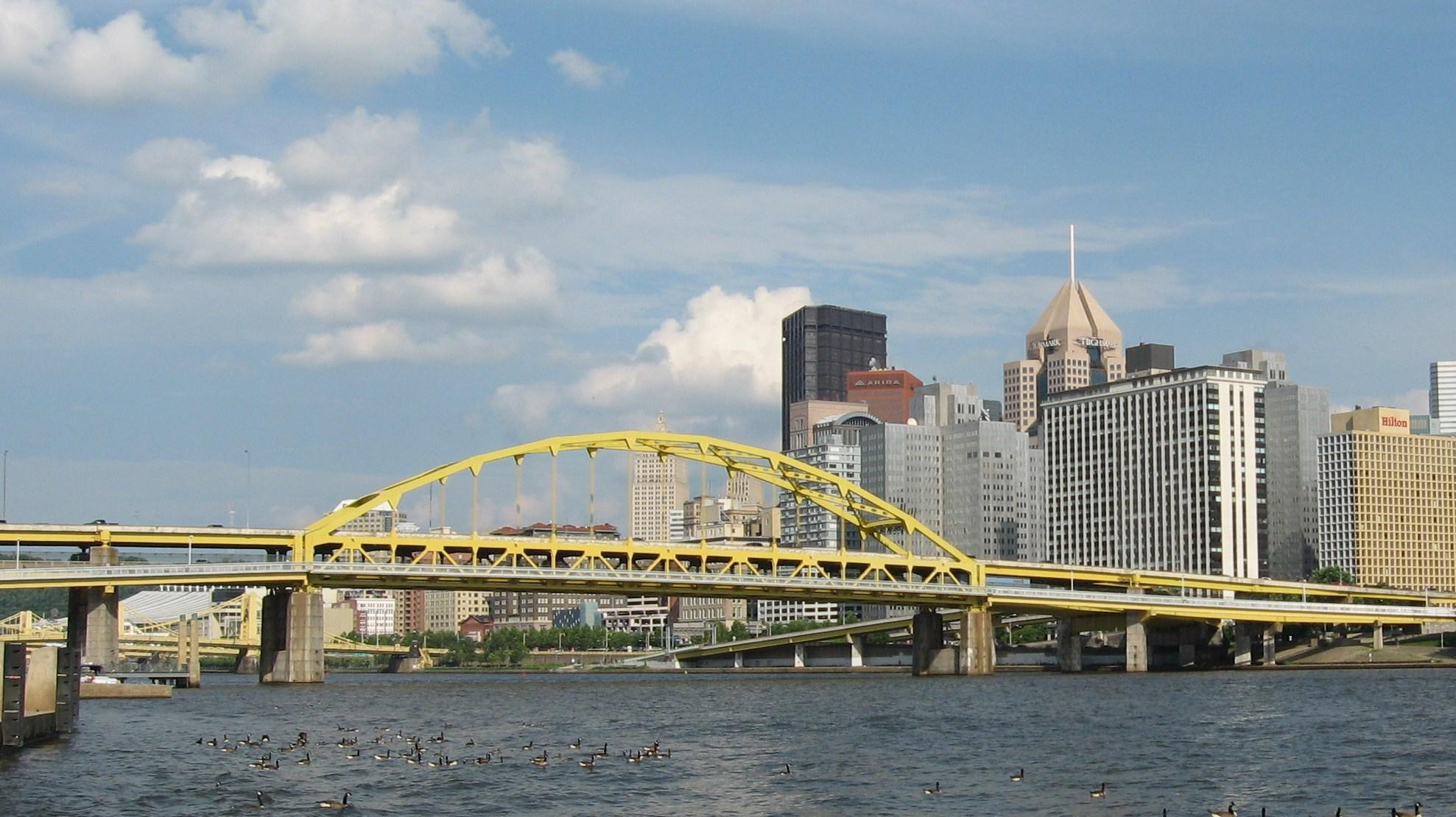
- Coordinates: 40.4443°N 80.0093°W
- Carries: 8 lanes (4 upper, 4 lower) of I-279 / US 19 Truck; Pedestrian Walkway on downriver side of the lower deck
- Crosses: Allegheny River
- Locale: Pittsburgh, Pennsylvania
- Official name: Fort Duquesne Bridge
- Other name: The Bridge To Nowhere
- Maintained by: PennDOT, FAJ

Characteristics
- Design: Double-decked bowstring arch bridge
- Material: Steel
- Longest span: 130 metres (430 ft)
- Piers in water: 4
- Clearance below: 14 metres (46 ft)

History
- Opened: October 17, 1969
- Replaces: Manchester Bridge

Location
- Interactive map of Fort Duquesne Bridge

The Fort Duquesne Bridge is a steel bowstring arch bridge that spans the Allegheny River in Pittsburgh, Pennsylvania. It was colloquially referred to as "The Bridge to Nowhere" prior to its completion.

== History ==
The Fort Duquesne Bridge was constructed from 1958 to 1963 by PennDOT, and opened for traffic on October 17, 1969, with its predecessor Manchester Bridge (located closer to the tip of Point State Park) closing that same day (it was demolished in the autumn of 1970). The bridge was named "The Bridge to Nowhere" because the main span was finished in 1963, but due to delays in acquiring the right of way for the northern approach ramps (due in part due to the pending construction on what would eventually become Three Rivers Stadium), it did not connect on the north side of the Allegheny River. The total cost was budgeted at $5 million in 1962. The lack of approach ramps meant the bridge ended in midair, rendering it useless.

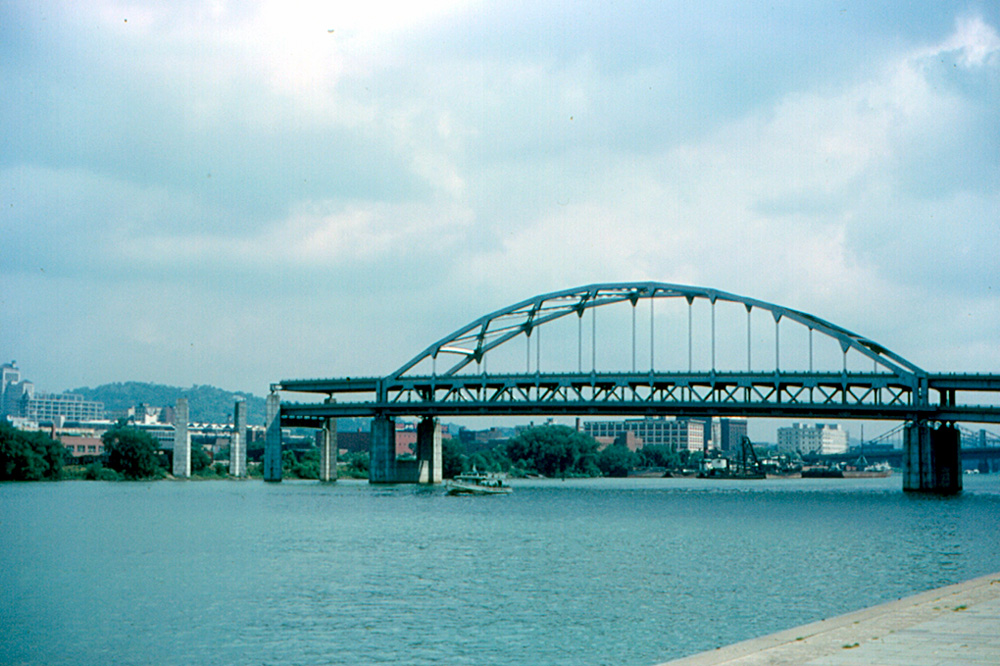
"Bridge to Nowhere" in 1966

On December 12, 1964, Frederick Williams, a 21-year-old chemistry major at the University of Pittsburgh from Basking Ridge, New Jersey, drove his 1959 Chrysler station wagon through the bridge's wooden barricades, raced off the end of the bridge, and landed upside-down but unhurt on the other side, 190 feet away at the north bank of the Allegheny River. His adventure is documented in WQED-TV's double Mid-Atlantic region Emmy Award-winning documentary "Flying off the Bridge to Nowhere and Other Tales of Pittsburgh Bridges", narrated by Rick Sebak.

Within a few weeks of this near tragedy, Pittsburgh radio personality, Rege Cordic, distributed commemorative bumper stickers which read "Official Entry, Cordic & Company Bridge Leap Contest." With thousands of vehicles bearing these stickers on Pittsburgh's streets, the city responded by blocking off the end of the bridge with concrete barriers.

The northwestern ramps were completed in 1969, allowing access to Pennsylvania Route 65, while the northeastern ramps were completed in 1986, with the construction of the northern section of Interstate 279 (North Shore Expressway) which runs through Downtown Pittsburgh's Golden Triangle and north towards Interstate 79. The bridge touches down halfway between Acrisure Stadium and PNC Park Baseball Stadium on the City's North Shore.

== See also ==
- List of crossings of the Allegheny River
