= Squirrel Hill Tunnel =

Road tunnel in Pittsburgh, Pennsylvania

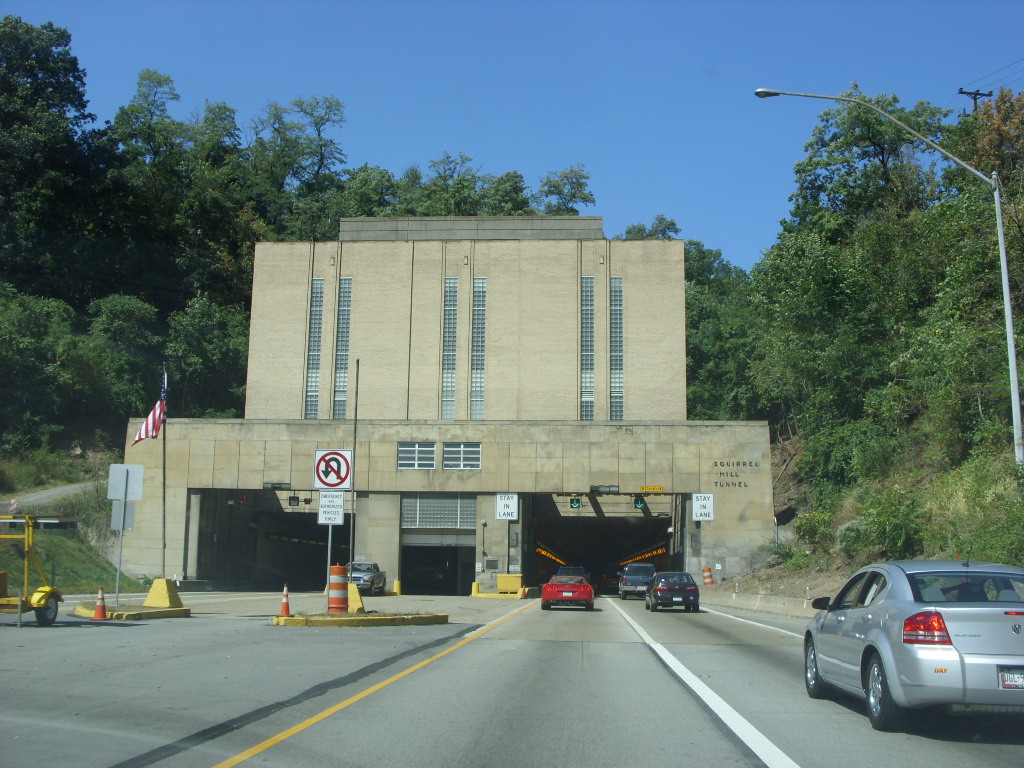
- Squirrel Hill Tunnel portal

Overview
- Location: Pittsburgh, Pennsylvania
- Coordinates: 763-4-1, 870+00 west portal 763-4-1, 912+25 east portal
- Route: I-376 / US 22 / US 30 (Parkway East)
- Start: I-376 Squirrel Hill interchange
- End: Nine Mile Run valley and Commercial St. Bridge

Operation
- Work began: 1945
- Constructed: Twin bore, concrete with ceramic tile lining
- Opened: June 5, 1953
- Owner: PennDOT
- Operator: PennDOT
- Traffic: automobile
- Toll: none
- Vehicles per day: 106,000

Technical
- Length: 4,225 feet (1,288 m)
- No. of lanes: 4
- Operating speed: 55 mph
- Tunnel clearance: 13.5 feet (4.1 m)
- Width: 28 feet (8.5 m)
- Grade: 2.5% (east to west)

The Squirrel Hill Tunnel is a tunnel in Pittsburgh, Pennsylvania, United States. It serves as an eastern gateway to the city for I-376 and was completed in 1953 after 8 years of construction and at a cost of US$18 million. At the time of opening it was the single largest investment by the Pennsylvania Department of Transportation. It is 4,225 feet (1,288 m) long and is a twin-bore tunnel with 8 cross passages.

== Overview ==
Construction on the Squirrel Hill Tunnel began in 1946, and it was opened to traffic on June 5, 1953. The tunnel consists of two bores that pass through Squirrel Hill in Pittsburgh, carrying two lanes of one-way traffic in each direction for Interstate 376 (Parkway East). At a cost of $18 million, it was the most costly single project built by the State Highways Department and completed the last link in the first 8-mile (13 km) section of the Parkway.

The tunnel consists of twin arch-shaped reinforced concrete bores that are 4,225 feet (1,288 m) long and approximately 29 ft 4 in (8.94 m) wide. The tunnel is segmented longitudinally by expansion joints which occur approximately every 50 ft 4 in (15.34 m) with some variation at the entrance and exit. The walls are approximately 1 ft 9 in (0.53 m) thick and extend 12 feet (3.7 m) above the top of barrier to the intersection with the roof arch. The roof arch is 3 feet (0.91 m) thick with an inside radius of 19 ft 3 in (5.87 m).

Since August 1987, the tunnels have provided cellular phone reception. The tunnel provided AM reception in 1958; however, due to design repairs, the reception was discontinued by the early 1960s until being reinstalled in 1986. Radio reception was improved to cover the entire tunnel in March 1997. With the help of Carnegie Mellon University graduate students, the tunnel has provided FM reception since May 2005; moreover, AM signals were upgraded at that time.

Before 2013, a 6-inch-thick (15 cm), cast-in-place concrete ceiling separated the arch from the traveled lanes of the tunnel bores to form a plenum, which provided ventilation for the tunnel. This ceiling was constructed 14 ft 2 in (4.32 m) above the roadway at its centerline. The ceiling was supported by steel hangers at the tunnel centerline. The plenum contained rectangular openings of varying dimensions that allowed circulation of exhaust and fresh air in the tunnels. In addition to providing ventilation, the plenum carried conduits to power the cellular phone equipment. Both roadway barriers in each bore were retrofitted in 1980 with 2 ft 0 in (0.61 m) concrete barriers and walkways for the entire length of the tunnel. The original roadway was also replaced with cement concrete pavement at the entrances and bituminous overlays through the remaining portion during the 1980 rehabilitation.

Beginning in June 2013 the ceiling plenum was removed to raise the height of the ceiling in the tunnel because large tractor trailers were crashing into it.

The tunnel has eight cross-passageways that connect bores and are spaced at approximately 503-foot (153 m) intervals. These cross-passageways have one fire door near the center, two fire extinguisher niches, two fire extinguisher cabinets, and emergency indicator lights at each end. Additionally, each cross-passageway contains a hose valve for use by emergency personnel.

The tunnel portal buildings, at each end of the tunnel, house the maintenance garages, office space for department maintenance personnel, and the exhaust and ventilation fan equipment for the tunnel. These buildings are constructed of cast-in-place concrete. The west portal building is constructed on caissons and has a series of chambers that comprise its basement. The rear portion of the building basement has no floor and is, in effect, a set of bridges that carry I-376 East and West above it. The east portal building is built on a series of variable-depth spread footings and contains no basement. Otherwise, the portal buildings have identical geometry. The facades and exterior surfaces of the portal buildings are sandstone and brick veneer with louvered openings and block-glass windows. A variety of cellular phone equipment has been added to the walls and roofs of the portal buildings. Additionally, the entrance to each tunnel has traffic signals mounted overhead, which are part of the over-height truck detection system.

The Squirrel Hill Tunnel lighting system consists of fluorescent fixtures for constant lighting throughout the length of the tunnel and low-pressure sodium fixtures for the threshold (day time) lighting at the tunnel entrances. Other tunnel operational systems include carbon monoxide monitoring, fire alarm, emergency communications, and an over-height truck detection system.

In Pittsburgh driving lore, the tunnels are notorious, most notably for several accidents when tractor-trailers that are too tall to safely travel through the tunnel get stuck against the roof of the tunnel. The Pennsylvania Department of Transportation raised the ceiling of the Squirrel Hill Tunnels to eliminate this problem and ease flow of traffic in and out of Pittsburgh. The tunnels also are known for generating traffic jams that can extend to the preceding exits because the highway narrows from four lanes to two.

Jalopnik listed Exit 74 on I-376 at #2 on its list of "The Ten Worst Exit Ramps In The US (and UK)."
