= Boulevard of the Allies =

Major road in Pittsburgh, US

Coordinates: 40.438775°N 80.003044°W

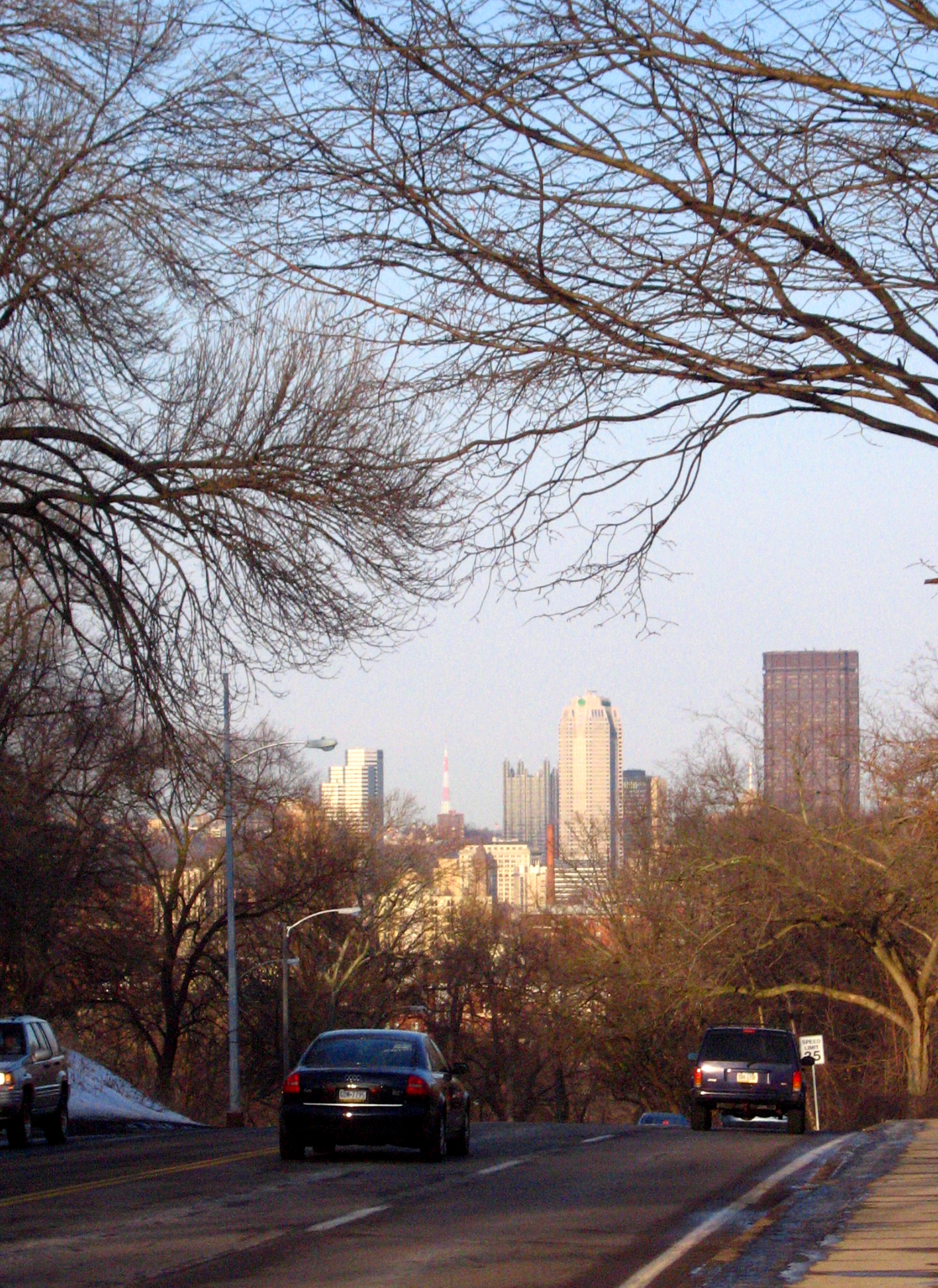
- Skyline of downtown Pittsburgh, as seen from the Boulevard of the Allies.
- Maintained by: City of Pittsburgh, PennDOT
- Length: 3.32 mi (5.34 km)
- Component highways: PA 885 from I-579 to Bates Street
- Location: Downtown Pittsburgh – Oakland, Pennsylvania, U.S.
- West end: Commonwealth Place in Pittsburgh
- Major junctions: Stanwix Street in Pittsburgh; I-376 / US 22 / US 30 (Penn-Lincoln Parkway) / Grant Street / 2nd Avenue / Court Place in Pittsburgh I-579 (Crosstown Boulevard) in Pittsburgh; I-376 / US 22 / US 30 (Penn-Lincoln Parkway) in Pittsburgh PA 885 south in Pittsburgh
- East end: Panther Hollow Road in Pittsburgh
- North: Third Avenue/Fourth Avenue
- South: Fort Pitt Boulevard

The Boulevard of the Allies is a mostly four-lane road in the U.S. state of Pennsylvania, connecting Downtown Pittsburgh with the Oakland neighborhood of the city.

Some sections are part of Pennsylvania Route 885. The road begins in Downtown Pittsburgh at its intersection with Commonwealth Place and an offramp from Interstate 279. The road continues east through Downtown passing Point Park University and the former Art Institute of Pittsburgh building to Grant Street where it becomes elevated to transition from the flat plain of Downtown to the bluff that Oakland sits on. Before reaching Oakland, it passes by Duquesne University and Mercy Hospital along the edge of a cliff several hundred feet above the Monongahela River with views of the city's South Side neighborhood and includes partial interchanges with Interstate 579 and Interstate 376. At its interchange with I-579, the road is split; westbound traffic must exit from the road onto I-579 or the Liberty Bridge. The second westbound portion of Boulevard of the Allies is only accessible via an entrance ramp from the Liberty Bridge. Upon reaching Oakland, it cuts through the southern portion of the neighborhood and leads into Schenley Park just bypassing the University of Pittsburgh and Carnegie Mellon University. Upon entering the park across the Anderson Bridge, the road's name changes to Panther Hollow Road (named after Panther Hollow) and continues through the park to become Hobart Street in the Squirrel Hill neighborhood east of Schenley Park.

The road is named in honor of the Allies of World War I. The Boulevard of the Allies was rededicated on June 29, 2008 as part of the celebration of Pittsburgh's 250th anniversary. As part of the rededication, American flags have been added on both sides of the boulevard as it elevates toward the Liberty Bridge ramp and thirty temporary banners celebrating the Allies of World War I have been affixed, following the road to its end.

== History ==
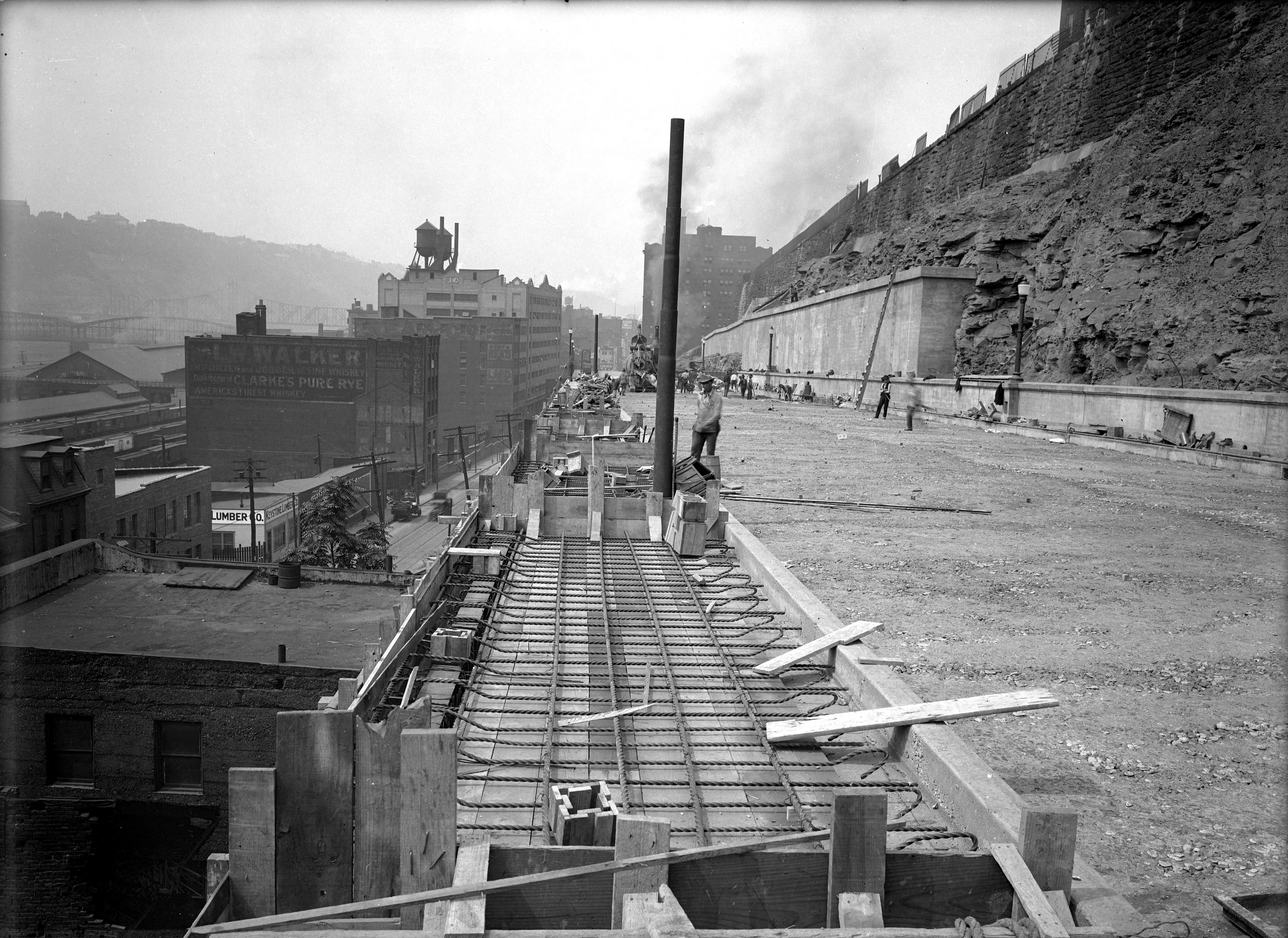
Construction of Boulevard of the Allies, 1922

The boulevard was first proposed in 1913 in order to alleviate traffic on Bigelow Boulevard (then known as Grant Boulevard), which was a major, though not very direct, route for automobile traffic between Downtown, Oakland, and Schenley Park. The proposed route, carved out of the Bluff above the Monongahela River, would connect the same areas over a distance about 1 mile (1.6 km) shorter. Like Pittsburgh's other boulevards, the new route would be off-limits to streetcars, wagons, and other slow-moving vehicles. In 1919, the Pittsburgh City Council selected "Boulevard of the Allies" as the name of the proposed roadway, previously known as Monongahela Boulevard.

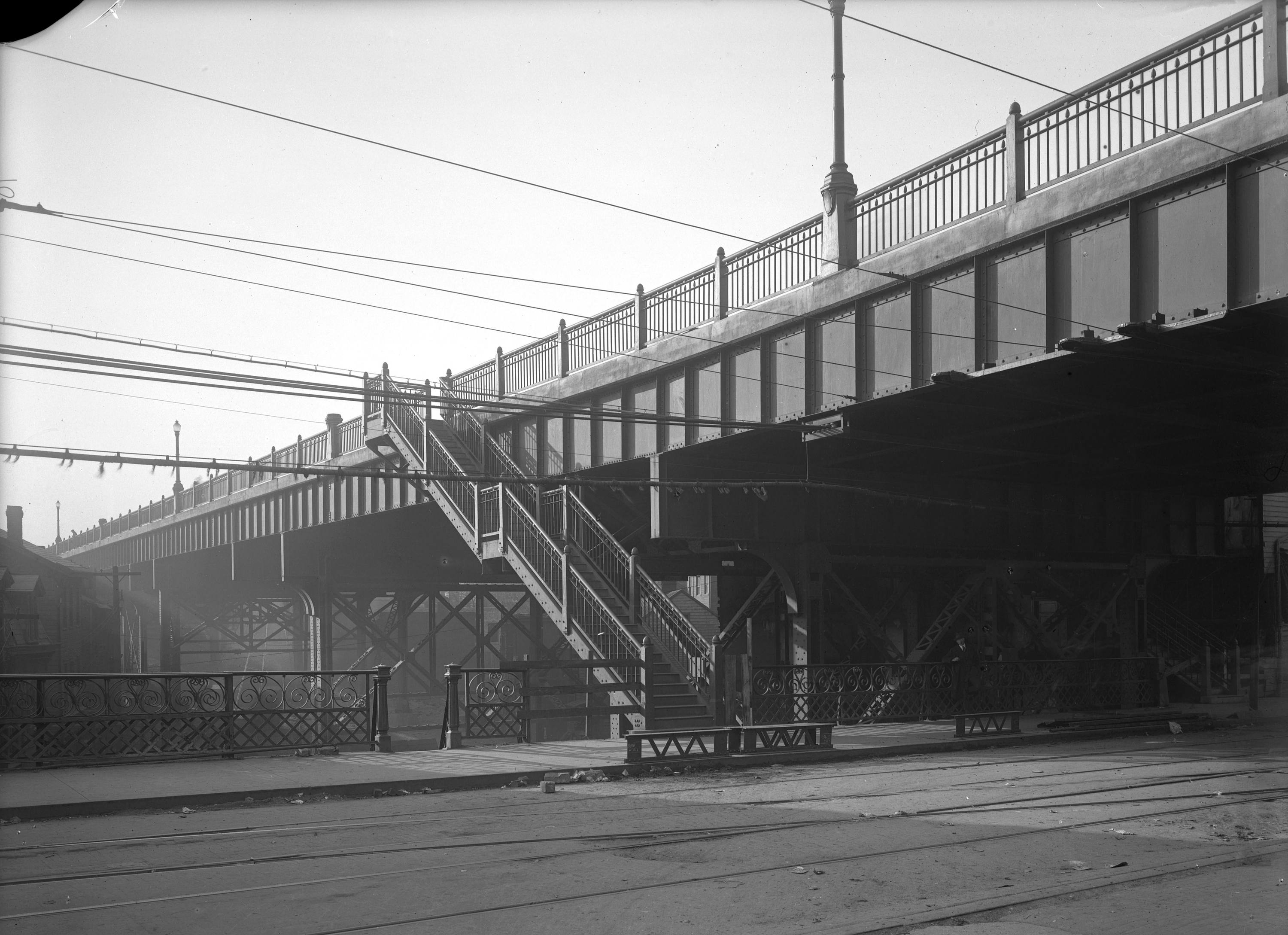
Boulevard of the Allies viaduct at the Brady Street Bridge, shortly after completion in 1922

Work began with the widening of Second Avenue to a width of 70 feet (20 m) between Liberty Avenue and Grant Street in 1920–21. The boulevard itself was built on an elevated viaduct beginning at Second Avenue and Grant Street and climbing over the Panhandle Route tracks onto the Bluff, where the roadway then followed the cliff edge eastward to Oakland. The project was an engineering challenge requiring extensive grading and numerous retaining walls and viaducts. Prior to completion, the cost was reported as $1.6 million per mile, said to be the most expensive road in the world at the time. The first section of the boulevard from Downtown to the intersection with Forbes Avenue at the edge of West Oakland opened on October 2, 1922, and was formally dedicated a month later on Armistice Day. The remainder of the route, extending to Schenley Park partly along the existing Emily and Wilmot Streets, was completed in 1930.

In 1923, an experimental synchronized traffic signal system which allowed a central operator to coordinate signal changes at multiple intersections was tested on the downtown section of the Boulevard. Another novel system was installed in 1931 which signaled a protected left turn automatically when a turning vehicle was detected. In 1924, the Boulevard became part of an alternate bypass route of the Lincoln Highway, whose original route used Bigelow Boulevard into downtown; this left the Boulevard at Forbes Avenue (its original terminus), following Beeler Street, Wilkins Avenue, and Dallas Avenue to the main route on Penn Avenue near East Liberty. The Boulevard at Grant Street was once home to Pittsburgh's Chinatown until the 1950s.

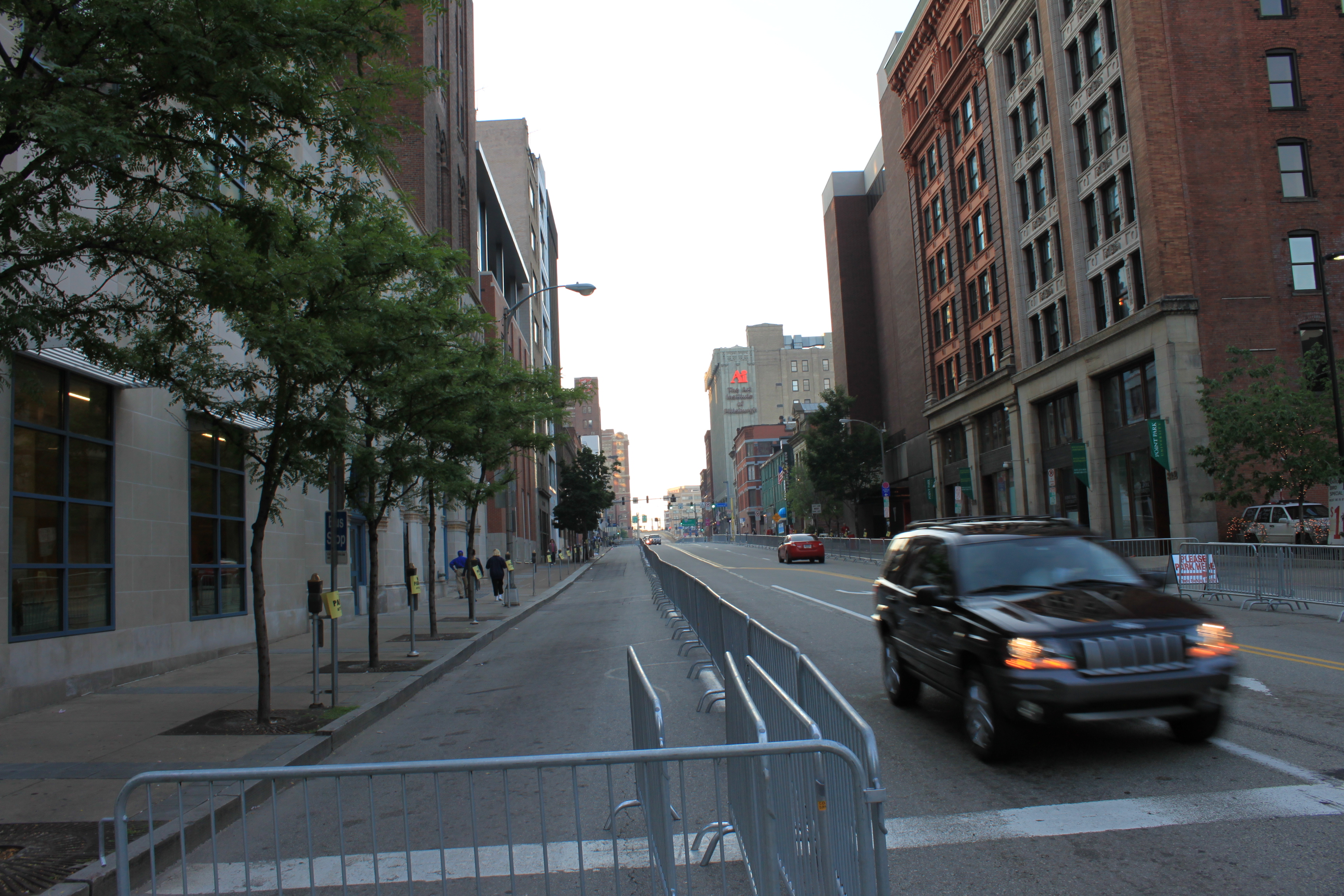
View of Boulevard of the Allies in downtown Pittsburgh

U.S. Route 22 and U.S. Route 30 were designated along the William Penn and Lincoln Highways through Pittsburgh in 1926; the Boulevard of the Allies bypass alignment was chosen for both routes. The portion of the road east from Forbes Avenue to Bates Street, still known as Wilmot Street, became a part of Pennsylvania Route 885 by 1940. With the completion of the Penn-Lincoln Parkway East in the late 1950s, US 22 and US 30 were moved off the Boulevard, and PA 885 was extended west a short distance to the interchange near the Birmingham Bridge. The construction of I-579 in the early 1960s cut the path of westbound Boulevard traffic into downtown; eventually the PA 885 designation was continued west to this interchange.

== Major junctions ==
The entire route is in Pittsburgh, Allegheny County.

mi	km	Destinations	Notes
0.00	0.00	Commonwealth Place to I-279 north / US 19 Truck north / I-376 west / US 22 west / US 30 west (Penn-Lincoln Parkway) – Point State Park, Fort Duquesne Bridge, Fort Pitt Bridge, Pittsburgh International Airport, Heinz Field, PNC Park	Western terminus; entrance from I-376 east
0.11	0.18	Purple Belt (Stanwix Street) – Allegheny Center	Western end of concurrency with Purple Belt
0.29	0.47	Wood Street to I-376 east / US 22 east / US 30 east (Penn-Lincoln Parkway) – Monroeville, Station Square, Smithfield Street Bridge, South Side	No left turns eastbound onto Wood Street
0.41	0.66	Purple Belt (Smithfield Street)	Eastern end of concurrency with Purple Belt for eastbound Boulevard of the Allies traffic (no left turns onto Grant Street)
0.51	0.82	I-376 / US 22 / US 30 (Penn-Lincoln Parkway) / Purple Belt (Grant Street) / 2nd Avenue / Court Place – Fort Pitt Bridge, Pittsburgh International Airport, Monroeville, Eliza Furnace Trail, PPG Paints Arena, Duquesne University, South Side	Eastern end of concurrency with Purple Belt for westbound Boulevard of the Allies traffic; no left turns from either direction; 2nd Avenue / Court Place exit and entrance ramps, respectively, to Ross Street; access to I-376 west via Grant Street
0.73	1.17	I-579 north to I-279 north (US 19 Truck north) – Veterans Bridge, PNC Park, Heinz Field, Convention Center Liberty Bridge to US 19 / PA 51 PA 885 begins	Northern end of concurrency with PA 885; northern terminus of PA 885; westbound traffic must exit and has no access to westbound Boulevard of the Allies west of interchange; no eastbound exit to I-579; southern terminus of I-579
1.20	1.93	Bluff Street – Duquesne University	Westbound exit only
1.83	2.95	I-376 east / US 22 east / US 30 east (Penn-Lincoln Parkway) – Monroeville	Eastbound exit only
1.89	3.04	I-376 west / US 22 west / US 30 west (Penn-Lincoln Parkway) – Downtown, Fort Pitt Bridge	Exit 72B (I-376); westbound exit and entrance
2.09	3.36	Fifth Avenue	Westbound entrance only
2.14	3.44	Forbes Avenue – Oakland	Eastbound exit only
2.77	4.46	PA 885 south (Bates Street) to I-376 east / US 22 east / US 30 east (Penn-Lincoln Parkway) – Glenwood, Monroeville	Eastern end of concurrency with PA 885; no left turns at intersection
3.32	5.34	Panther Hollow Road – Phipps Conservatory and Botanical Gardens, Flagstaff Hill, Oakland, Squirrel Hill, Schenley Park	Eastern terminus; interchange
1.000 mi = 1.609 km; 1.000 km = 0.621 mi: Concurrency terminus; Incomplete access
