= Pennsylvania Route 885 =

State highway in Allegheny County, Pennsylvania, US

Pennsylvania Route 885

Route information
- Maintained by PennDOT
- Length: 14.1 mi (22.7 km)
- Existed: 1928–present

Major junctions
- South end: PA 837 / PA 51 Truck in Clairton
- PA 837 in Pittsburgh; I-376 / US 22 / US 30 in Pittsburgh
- North end: I-579 / Liberty Bridge in Pittsburgh

Location
- Country: United States
- State: Pennsylvania
- Counties: Allegheny

Highway system
- Pennsylvania State Route System; Interstate; US; State; Scenic; Legislative
← PA 884	→ PA 886

Pennsylvania Route 885 (PA 885) is a 14.1-mile-long (22.69 km) north–south state highway in the U.S. state of Pennsylvania. It runs from Pennsylvania Route 837 in Clairton north to Interstate 579 in Pittsburgh. The route is entirely within Allegheny County and serves as a connector between the city of Pittsburgh and its southern suburbs.

== Route description ==
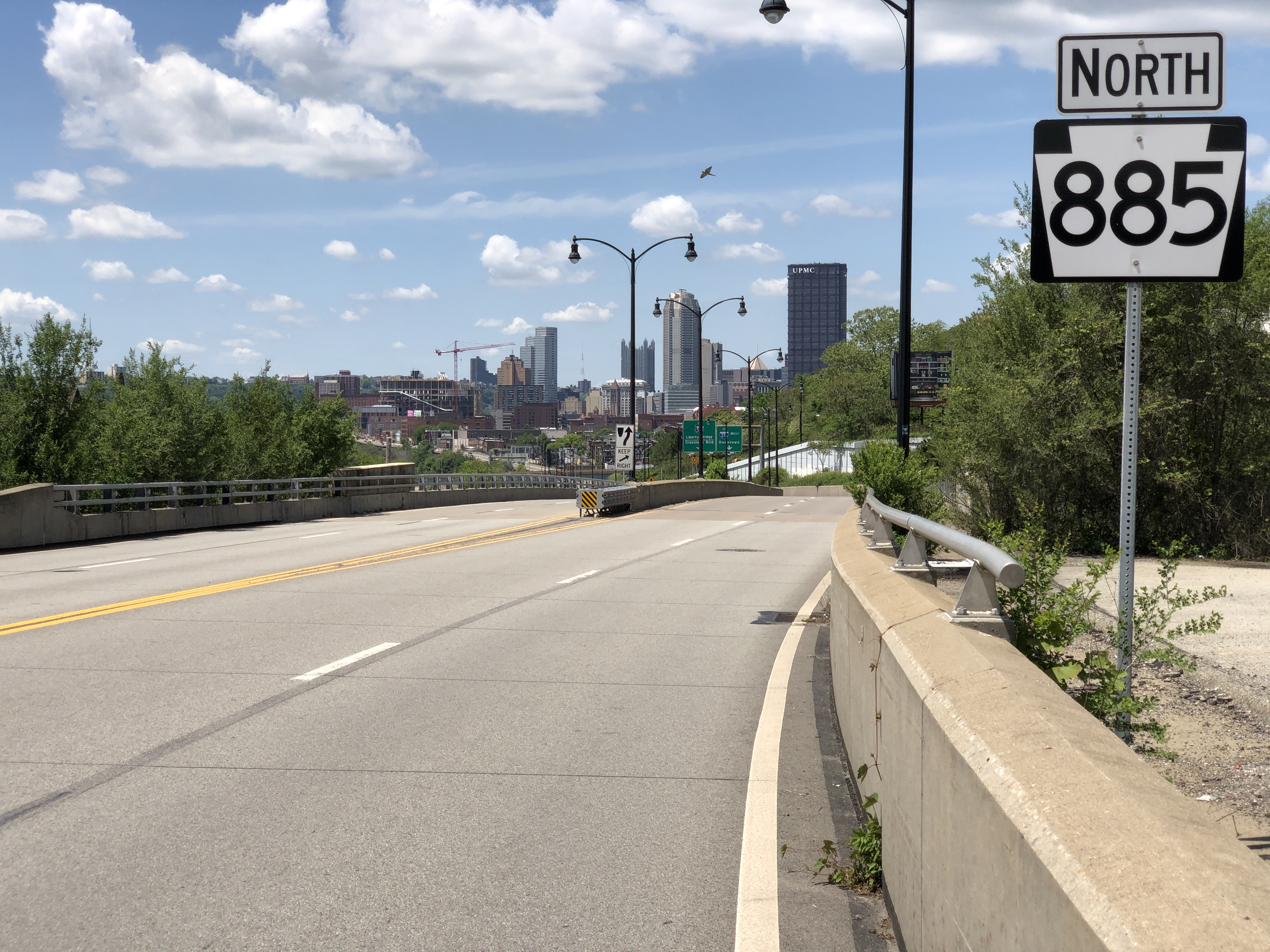
PA 885 northbound at Forbes Avenue in Pittsburgh

=== Clairton to Oakland ===
PA 885 starts in the Wilson section of the city of Clairton at the intersection with State Street (Pennsylvania Route 837). From there, the route runs uphill heading southwest as Walnut Avenue before turning north at the west end of Clairton. Outside the vicinity, the route journeys northwest as Clairton Road while traversing a rural and mountainous region of Allegheny County. PA 885 then travels towards the north while passing through the western regions of the borough of West Mifflin. Shortly after becoming a four-lane undivided highway, it bypasses the former Century III Mall to the East.

PA 885 briefly runs concurrent with Lebanon Church Road (Yellow Belt) before bearing north as Lebanon Road where it passes underneath a runway of Allegheny County Airport. North of the airport, it journeys past elevations of up to 1,200 feet before turning northwest onto Mifflin Road. PA 885 then enters the city of Pittsburgh via the neighborhood of Hays as Ashby Street where it meets Pennsylvania Route 837 at an interchange. Shortly after, it crosses the Monongahela River via the Glenwood Bridge and enters the neighborhood of Hazelwood.

In Hazelwood, PA 885 travels northwest as Second Avenue and Irvine Street. In the northern section of Hazelwood, the route turns onto Greenfield Avenue before running beneath the railroad tracks. From there, PA 885 again becomes Second Avenue and parallels the Monongahela River to the south and the Three Rivers Heritage Trail to the north. Upon entering Oakland, the academic and cultural center of Pittsburgh, the route turns north onto Bates Street and right away has an interchange with Interstate 376 (overlapped with US 22 and US 30). PA 885 follows Bates Street before bearing west onto the Boulevard of the Allies.

=== Boulevard of the Allies ===
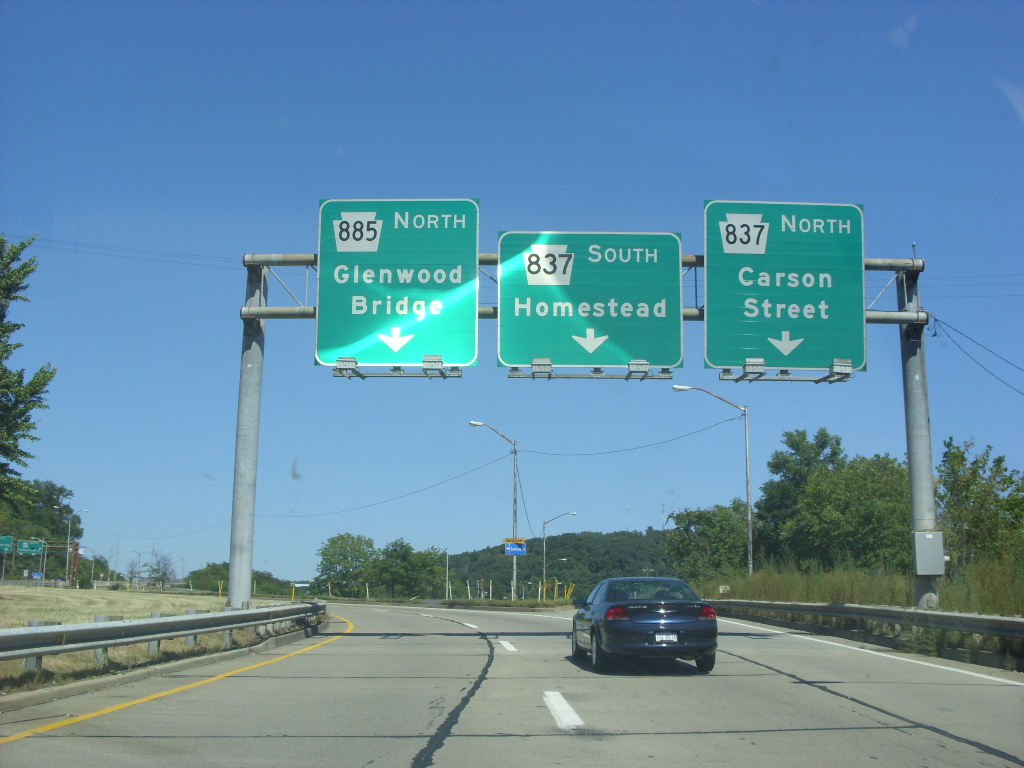
PA 885 interchange with PA 837 in Pittsburgh.

The northernmost segment of PA 885 is designated as the Boulevard of the Allies in dedication of the Allies victory in World War I. The route joins the Boulevard less than a mile west of Schenley Park in Oakland. The route embarks across the Southern sectors of Oakland as a four-lane divided highway. As the route journeys west, it meets Interstate 376 and Forbes Avenue at a partial interchange near Birmingham Bridge. PA 885 then travels along a cliff, parallel to both Interstate 376 and the Monongahela River to the south and enters the Pittsburgh neighborhood of Bluff, also known as Uptown. PA 885 also passes to the south of Mercy Hospital and Duquesne University before ending at a partial interchange with Interstate 579 and the Liberty Bridge in Downtown Pittsburgh.

== History ==
Planning began in the early 1920s for the Boulevard of the Allies, extending east from Second Avenue and Grant Street to Oakland. The first part of the Boulevard of the Allies was dedicated on August 8, 1921, and the entire highway opened to traffic on October 2, 1923, including several viaducts and widenings of the existing Emily Street to a terminus at Wilmot Street and Forbes Avenue. One of the first interconnected traffic signal systems was installed a month later (November 13) on the Boulevard downtown as an experiment. Prior to completion, its cost was reported as $1.6 million per mile, the most expensive road in the world at the time. In 1924, the Boulevard became part of an alternate bypass route of the Lincoln Highway, whose original route used Bigelow Boulevard into downtown; this left the Boulevard at Forbes Avenue (its original terminus), following Beeler Street, Wilkins Avenue, and Dallas Avenue to the main route on Penn Avenue near East Liberty.

U.S. Route 22 and U.S. Route 30 were designated along the William Penn and Lincoln Highways through Pittsburgh in 1926; the Boulevard of the Allies bypass alignment was chosen for both routes. The portion of the road east from Forbes Avenue to Bates Street, still known as Wilmot Street, became a part of PA 885 by 1940. With the completion of the Penn-Lincoln Parkway East in the late 1950s, US 22 and US 30 were moved off the Boulevard, and PA 885 was extended west a short distance to the interchange near the Birmingham Bridge. The construction of I-579 in the early 1960s cut the path of westbound Boulevard traffic into downtown; eventually the PA 885 designation was continued west to this interchange.

== Major intersections ==
The entire route is in Allegheny County.

Location	mi	km	Destinations	Notes
Clairton	0.0	0.0	PA 837 / PA 51 Truck (State Street) – Clairton-Glassport Bridge	Southern terminus
West Mifflin	4.8	7.7	Yellow Belt (Lebanon Church Road) – Allegheny County Airport	Southern end of Yellow Belt concurrency
West Mifflin	5.1	8.2	Yellow Belt (Lebanon Church Road) – Baldwin	Northern end of Yellow Belt concurrency
Pittsburgh	7.9	12.7	Southern end of limited-access section	
Pittsburgh	7.9	12.7	Mifflin Road	Northbound exit and southbound entrance
Pittsburgh	8.1	13.0	Baldwin Road	Southbound exit only; signed as Streets Run Road
Pittsburgh	8.5– 8.7	13.7– 14.0	PA 837 (West 8th Avenue / East Carson Street) / Glass Run Road – Homestead	Northbound at-grade intersection with Glass Run Road
Monongahela River	8.9– 9.1	14.3– 14.6	Glenwood Bridge	
Pittsburgh	9.1	14.6	Northern end of limited-access section	
Pittsburgh	11.6	18.7	Hot Metal Street (Hot Metal Bridge) – South Side	
Pittsburgh	11.7	18.8	Second Avenue – Downtown	
Pittsburgh	11.8	19.0	I-376 east (US 22 east / US 30 east) – Monroeville	Exits 73A-B on I-376
Pittsburgh	12.0	19.3	Boulevard of the Allies	
Pittsburgh	12.7	20.4	Forbes Avenue – Oakland	Southbound exit only
Pittsburgh	12.8	20.6	Fifth Avenue	Northbound entrance only
Pittsburgh	13.0	20.9	I-376 west (US 22 west / US 30 west) – Downtown, Fort Pitt Bridge	Northbound exit and entrance; exit 72B on I-376
Pittsburgh	13.1	21.1	I-376 east (US 22 east / US 30 east) – Monroeville	Southbound exit only
Pittsburgh	13.6	21.9	Bluff Street – Duquesne University	Northbound exit only
Pittsburgh	14.1	22.7	I-579 north to I-279 north (US 19 Truck north) – Veterans Bridge Liberty Bridge to US 19 / PA 51	Northern terminus; southern terminus of I-579; access to PNC Park, Acrisure Stadium, and Convention Center
1.000 mi = 1.609 km; 1.000 km = 0.621 mi: Concurrency terminus; Incomplete access
