= List of Interstate Highways in Pennsylvania =

Interstate Highways of the Pennsylvania State Route System
- Route markers for Interstate 83, Interstate 376, Interstate 83 Business, and Interstate 376 Business
- Interstate Highways highlighted in red

System information
- Notes: All routes are assigned State Route (SR X) numbers, usually corresponding to the signed numbers. Interstates are generally state-maintained.

Highway names
- Interstates: Interstate X (I-X)
- Business Loops: Interstate X Business (I-X Bus.)

System links
- Pennsylvania State Route System; Interstate; US; State; Scenic; Legislative

The list of Interstate Highways in Pennsylvania encompasses 23 Interstate Highways—12 primary routes and 11 auxiliary routes—which exist entirely or partially in the U.S. state of Pennsylvania. In Pennsylvania, most of the Interstate Highways are maintained by the Pennsylvania Department of Transportation (PennDOT). Some stretches are also maintained by the Pennsylvania Turnpike Commission, Delaware River Port Authority, the Delaware River Joint Toll Bridge Commission, and two short stretches maintained by the New York State Department of Transportation (these being the Delaware River bridge on Interstate 84 (I-84) and a short stretch of I-86 in Bradford County). Interstate Highways make up three percent of all roadway lane miles in Pennsylvania and have a combined length of 1,953 mi (3,143 km) within the state. Twenty-four percent of all vehicle traffic is on the Interstate System.

== Primary Interstate Highways ==
Number	Length (mi)	Length (km)	Southern or western terminus	Northern or eastern terminus	Formed	Removed	Notes
I-70	167.92	270.24	I-70 at West Virginia border in Donegal Township	I-70/US 522 at Maryland border near Warfordsburg	1956	current	
I-70S	36.7	59.1	I-70/I-79 in North Beaver Township	I-70/I-80S/Penna Turnpike in New Stanton	1957	1964	I-70S bypassed Pittsburgh to the south; I-70 rerouted to avoid Pittsburgh onto I-70S
I-76	349.67	562.74	I-76 at Ohio border in North Beaver Township	I-76 at New Jersey border in Philadelphia	1964	current	
I-78	75.23	121.07	I-81 in Union Township	I-78 at New Jersey border in Williams Township	1956	current	Briefly designated as I-80N from 1957 to 1958
I-79	182.72	294.06	I-79 at West Virginia border in Perry Township	Bayfront Parkway in Erie	1956	current	Called the Raymond P. Shafer Highway for its entire length
I-80	311.07	500.62	I-80 at Ohio border in Shenango Township	I-80 at New Jersey border in Delaware Water Gap	1956	current	
I-80S	349.67	562.74	I-80S at Ohio border in North Beaver Township	I-80S at New Jersey border in Philadelphia	1956	1964	Renumbered to I-76 to conform to AASHTO policy against suffixed routes
I-81	232.63	374.38	I-81 at Maryland border near Greencastle	I-81 at New York border near Hallstead	1956	current	Called the American Legion Memorial Highway while in Pennsylvania
I-83	50.8	81.8	I-83 at Maryland border near Shrewsbury	I-81/US 322 in Harrisburg	1956	current	Known as the Veterans of Foreign Wars of the United States Memorial Highway as well as the Harrisburg–York–Baltimore Expressway
I-84	54.55	87.79	I-81/I-380/US 6 in Dunmore	I-84 at New York border in Matamoras	1958	current	
I-86	6.99	11.25	I-90 in Greenfield Township I-86 at New York border in South Waverly	I-86 at New York border in North East Township I-86 at New York border in South Waverly	1999	current	Named the Hopkins-Bowser Highway; portion of its future route maintained by New York State
I-90	46.4	74.7	I-90 at Ohio border in Springfield Township	I-90 at New York border in North East Township	1956	current	Known as the AMVETS Memorial Highway
I-95	44.25	71.21	I-95 at Delaware border near Marcus Hook	I-95 at New Jersey border near Bristol	1956	current	Known as the Vietnam Veterans Memorial Highway
I-99	149.00	239.79	I-70/I-76/US 220 near Bedford I-180/US 15/US 220 in Williamsport, PA	US 220/PA 26 near Bellefonte I-99 at New York border in Lawrence Township	1998	current	Known as the Appalachian Thruway; will eventually connect together via US 220
Former

== Auxiliary Interstate Highways ==
Number	Length (mi)	Length (km)	Southern or western terminus	Northern or eastern terminus	Formed	Removed	Notes
I-176	11.33	18.23	I-76 in Morgantown	US 422 near Reading	1964	current	Also called the Morgantown Expressway
I-178	—	—	—	—	—	1971	Cancelled
I-179	—	—	—	—	1958	1968	Replaced by its parent route, I-79
I-180	28.85	46.43	I-99/US 15/US 220 in Williamsport	I-80/PA 147 near Milton	1984	current	
I-180	—	—	—	—	—	1964	Now part of I-176
I-276	29.78	47.93	I-76 in King of Prussia	I-95 and I-295 in Bristol Township	1964	current	
I-280	—	—	—	—	1958	1964	Now part of Pennsylvania Turnpike
I-279	13.32	21.44	I-376/US 22/US 30 in Pittsburgh	I-79 in Franklin Park	1972	current	Also known as the Parkway North, North Shore Expressway, East Street Valley Expressway and the Raymond E. Wilt Memorial Highway
I-283	2.91	4.68	I-76 near Highspire	I-83/US 322 near Harrisburg	1972	current	The highway is entirely in Dauphin County and Lancaster County and is an eastern shore bypass of Harrisburg.
I-295	10.324	16.615	I-95/I-276 in Bristol Township	I-295 at New Jersey border near Yardley	2018	current	
I-376	84.70	136.31	I-80/PA 760 in Shenango Township	I-76/US 22 in Monroeville	1972	current	Follows the Beaver Valley Expressway, the James E. Ross Highway, and the Penn-Lincoln Parkway
I-378	—	—	—	—	1968	1971	Replaced by PA 378
I-380	28.25	45.46	I-80 in Tunkhannock Township	I-81/I-84/US 6 in Dunmore	1973	current	Known as the Scranton-Dunmore Expressway in Scranton
I-476	132.10	212.59	I-95 in Woodlyn	I-81/US 6/US 11 in Clarks Summit	1964	current	Longest Auxiliary Interstate in Pennsylvania and the United States.
I-479	—	—	—	—	1966	1971	Early number for I-579
I-480	—	—	—	—	1958	1964	Now part of I-476
I-495	—	—	—	—	1956	1958	Early number for I-476
I-579	1.57	2.53	PA 885 in Pittsburgh	I-279/US 19 Truck/PA 28 in Pittsburgh	1962	current	Called the Crosstown Boulevard
I-676	2.15	3.46	I-76/US 30 in Philadelphia	I-676/US 30 at New Jersey border in Philadelphia	1964	current	Called the Vine Street Expressway
I-695	—	—	I-95 near Philadelphia International Airport	I-95 in Philadelphia	1964	1977	Never built
I-876	—	—	—	—	1971	1972	Short lived renumbering of I-479, now I-579
I-895	—	—	I-295 in Burlington, NJ	I-95 in Bristol	1963	1981	Never built
Former

== Business routes ==
Number	Length (mi)	Length (km)	Southern or western terminus	Northern or eastern terminus	Formed	Removed	Notes
I-83 BL	6.81	10.96	I-83 in York Township	I-83/PA 181 in Manchester Township	1957	current	Serves York, running along George Street; only Interstate business route in Pennsylvania until 2009
I-376 BL	6.26	10.07	I-376 in Findlay Township	I-376 in Moon Township	2009	current	Runs along Airport Parkway near the Pittsburgh International Airport

== Gallery ==
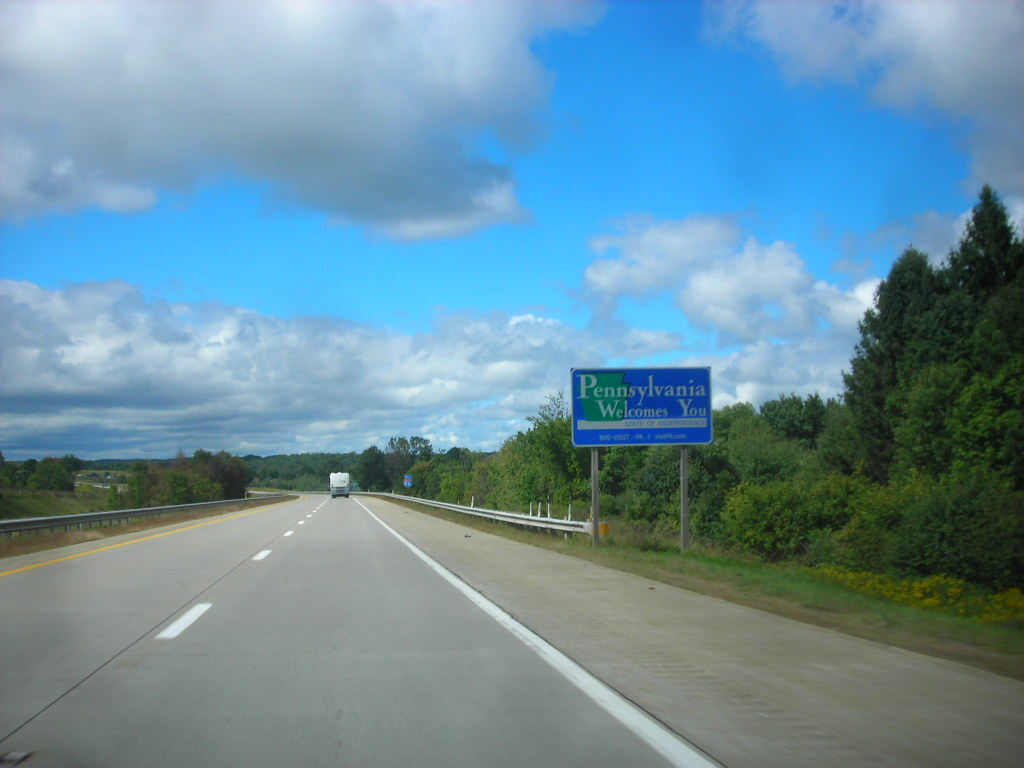
Entering Pennsylvania on I-86 westbound in Erie County

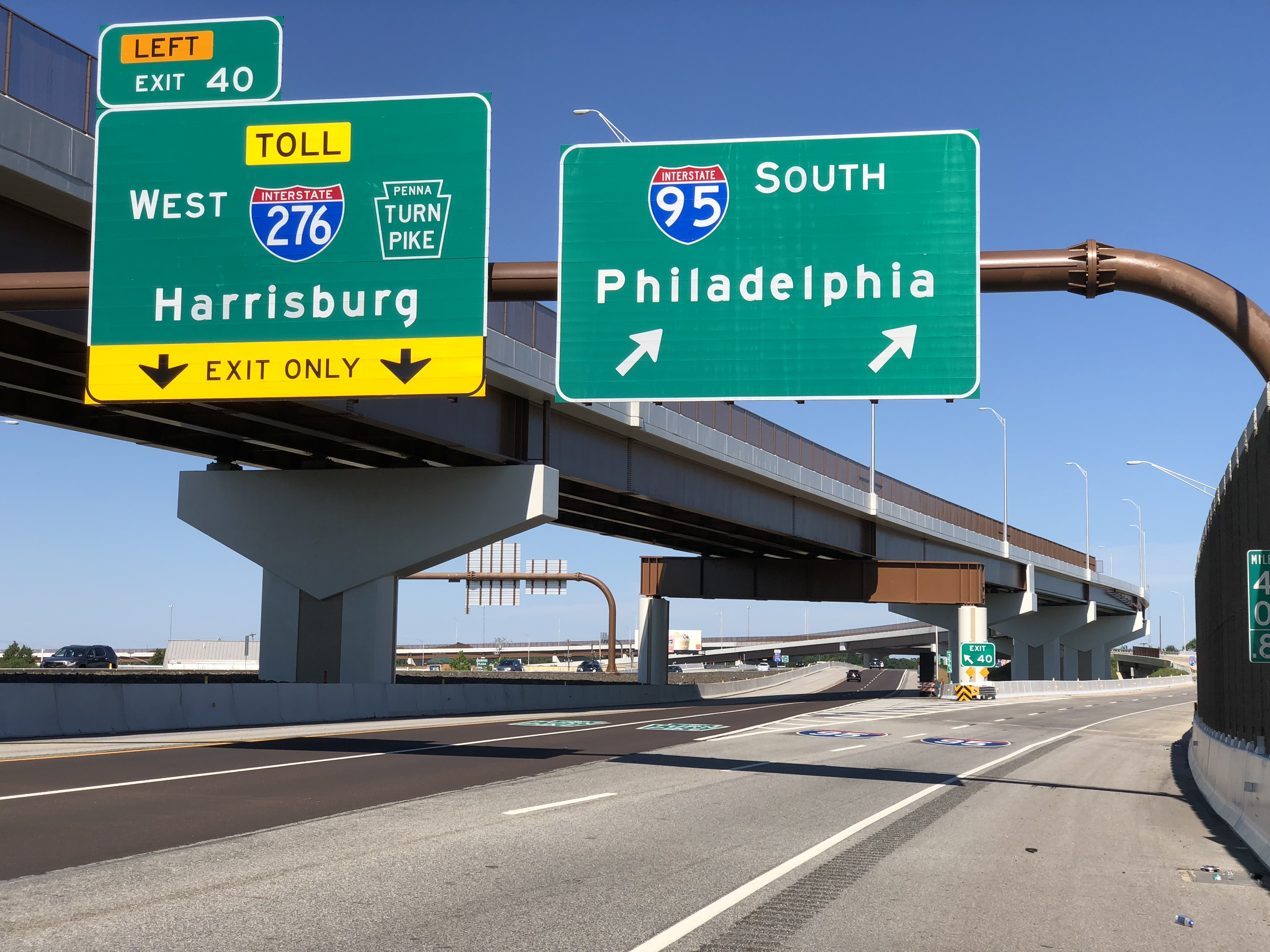
I-95 at I-276 exit

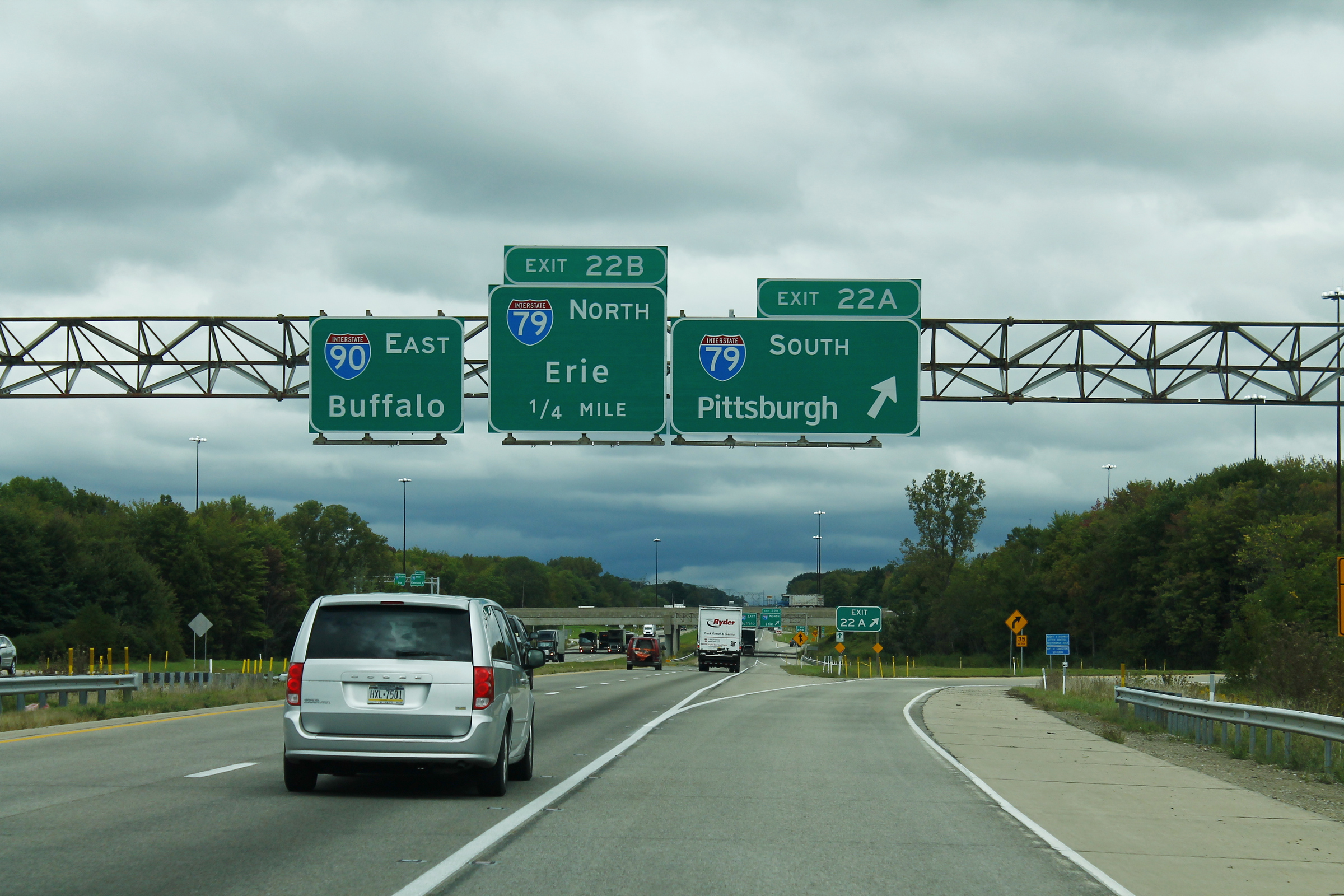
I-90 at I-79 exit

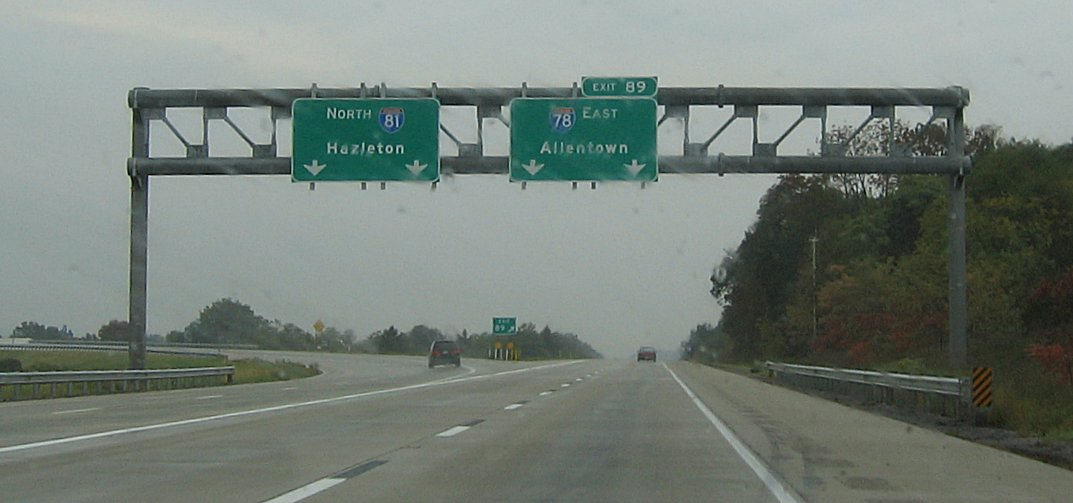
I-81 at I-78 exit

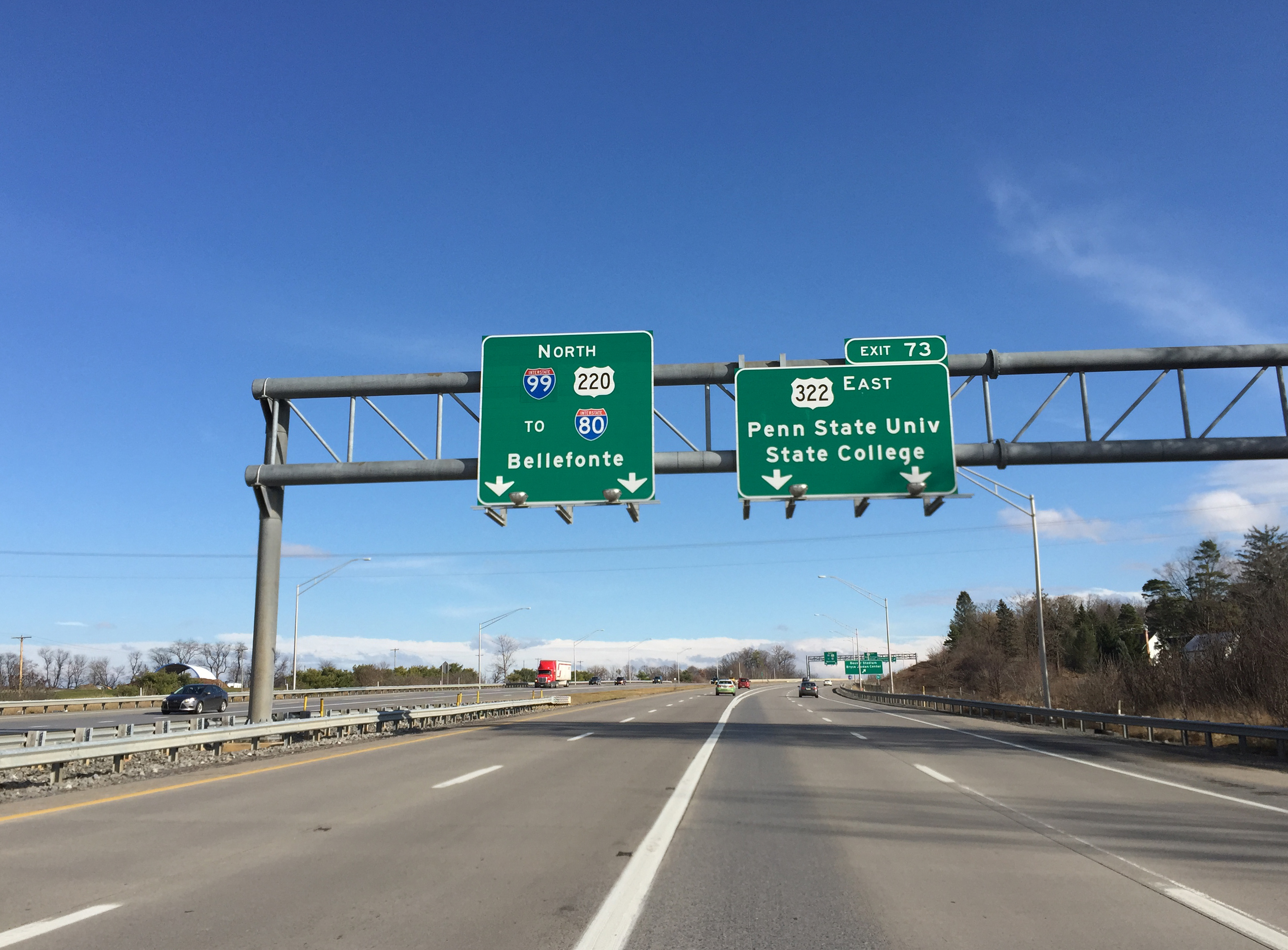
I-99 to I-80

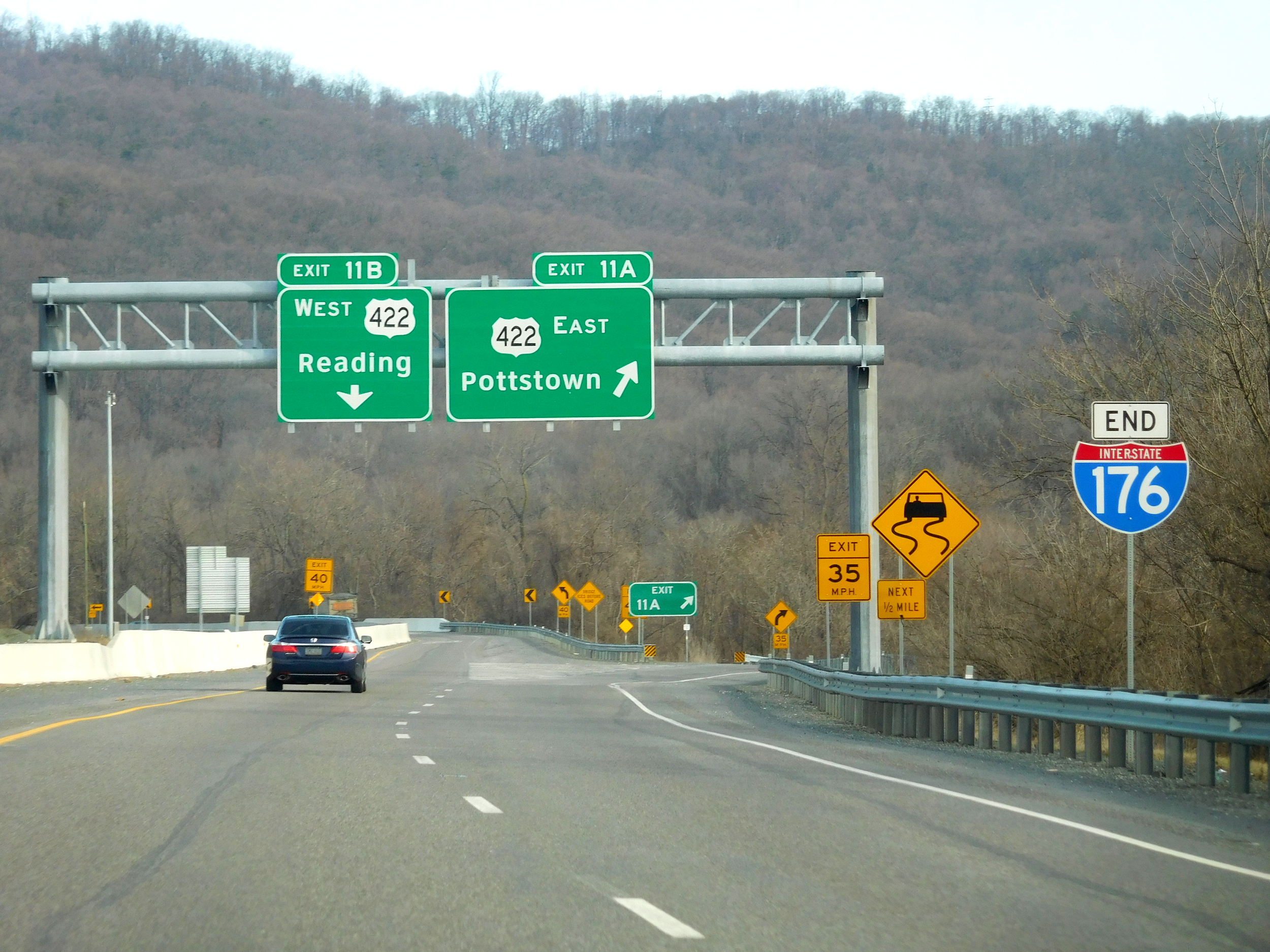
I-176 end at US 422

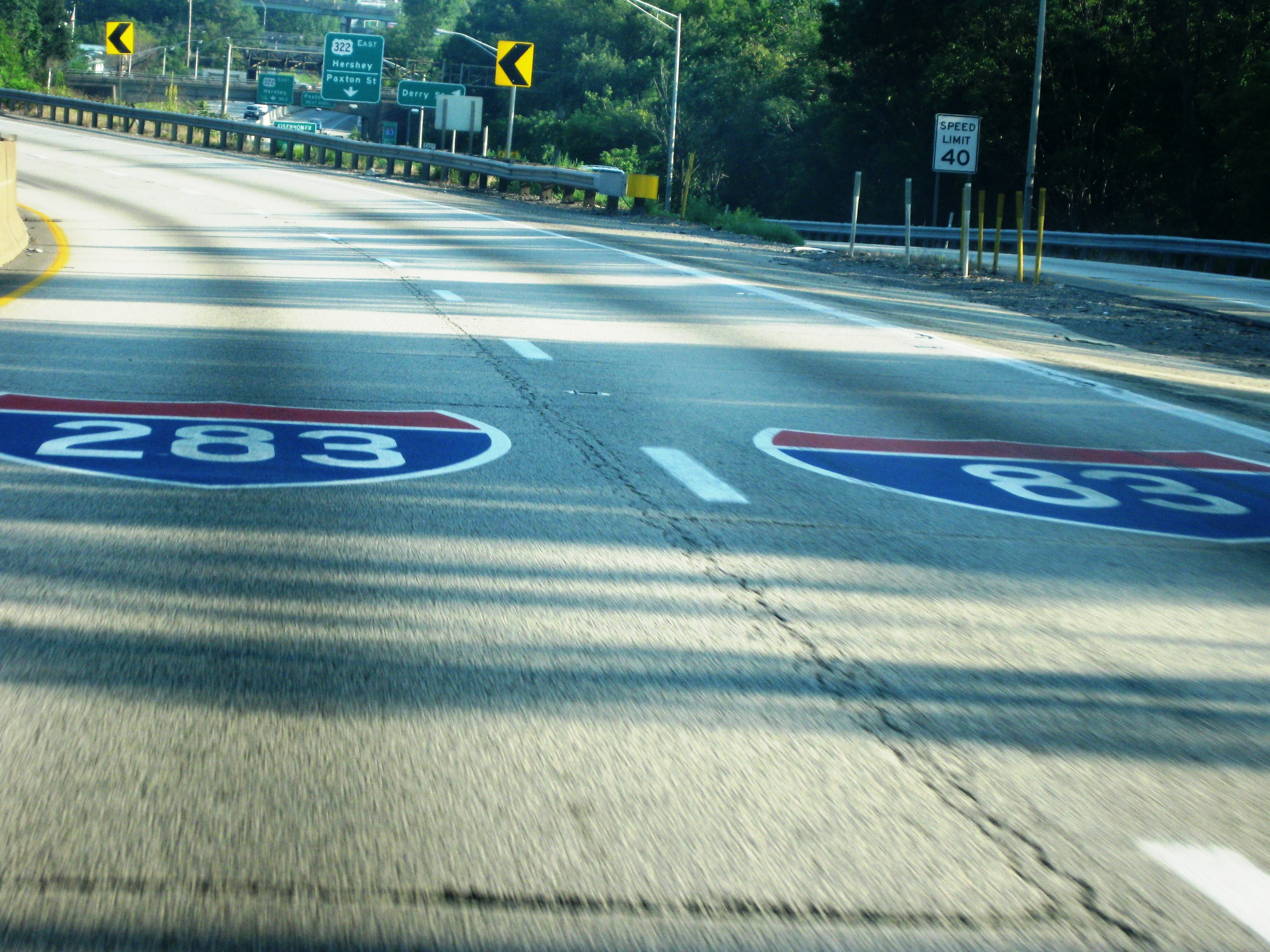
I-83 and I-283

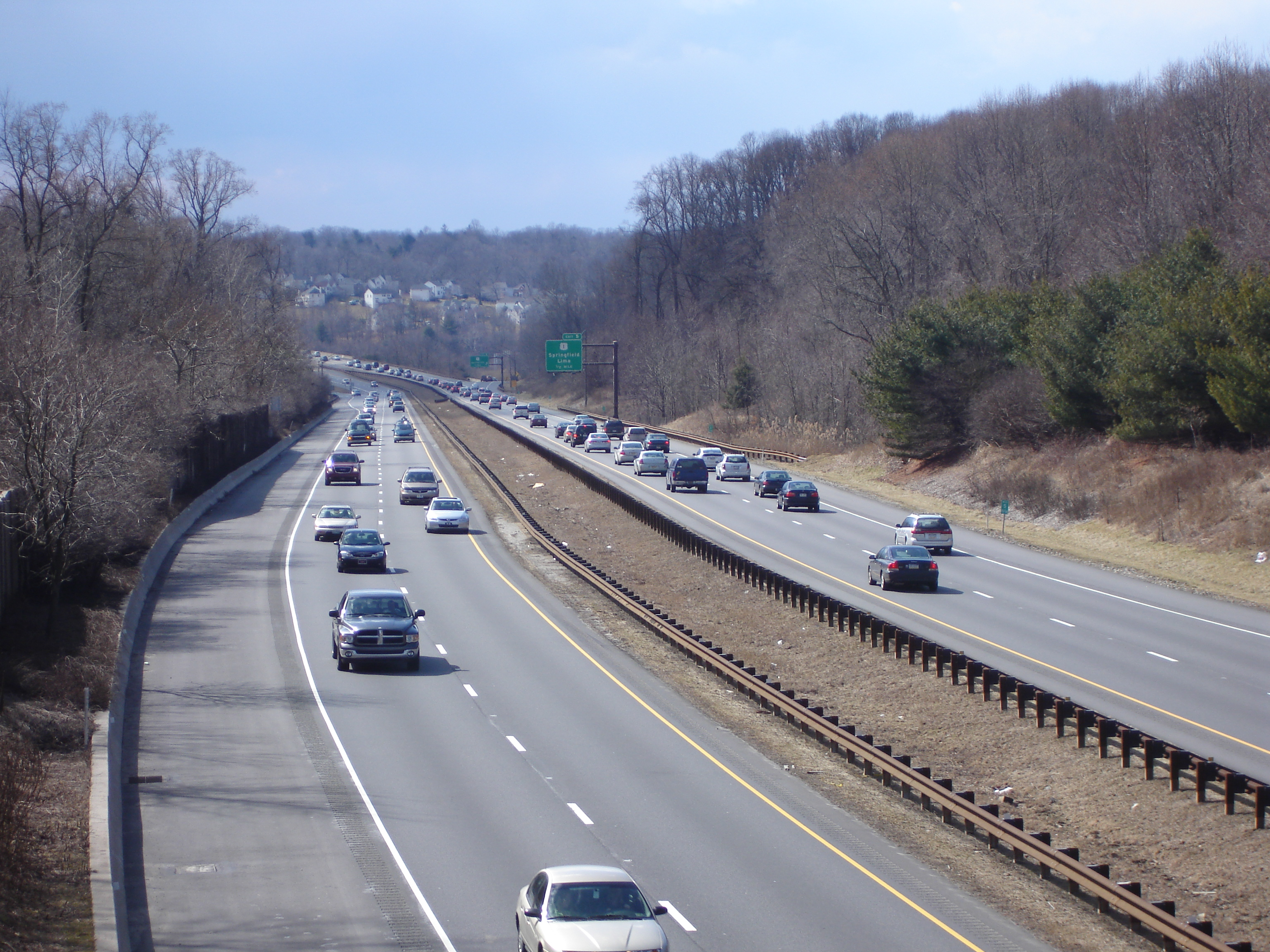
I-476 north of US 1

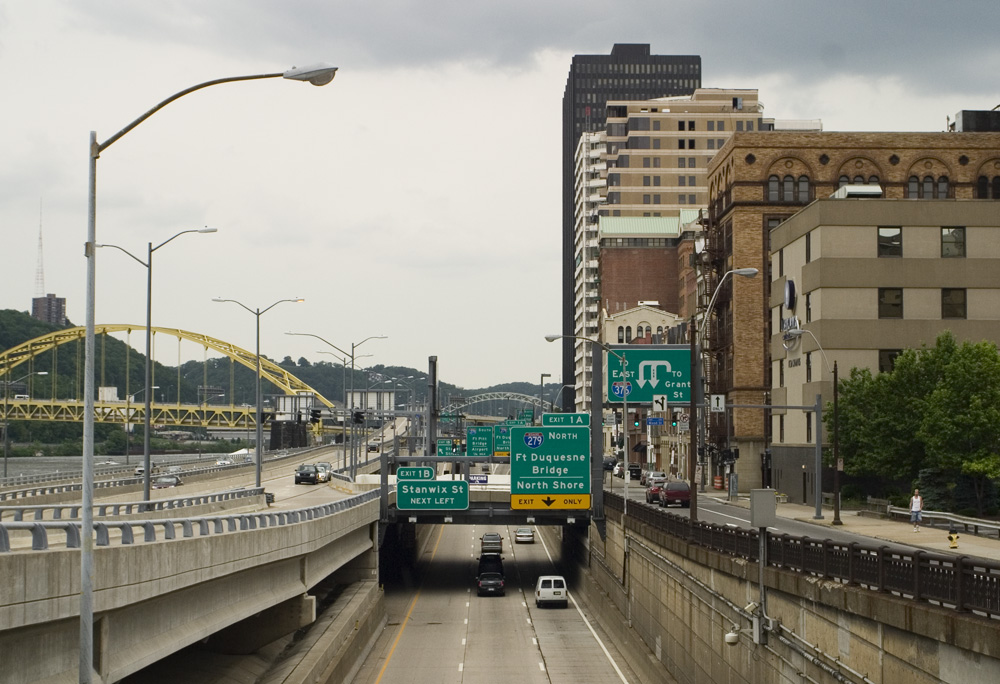
I-376 in Pittsburgh

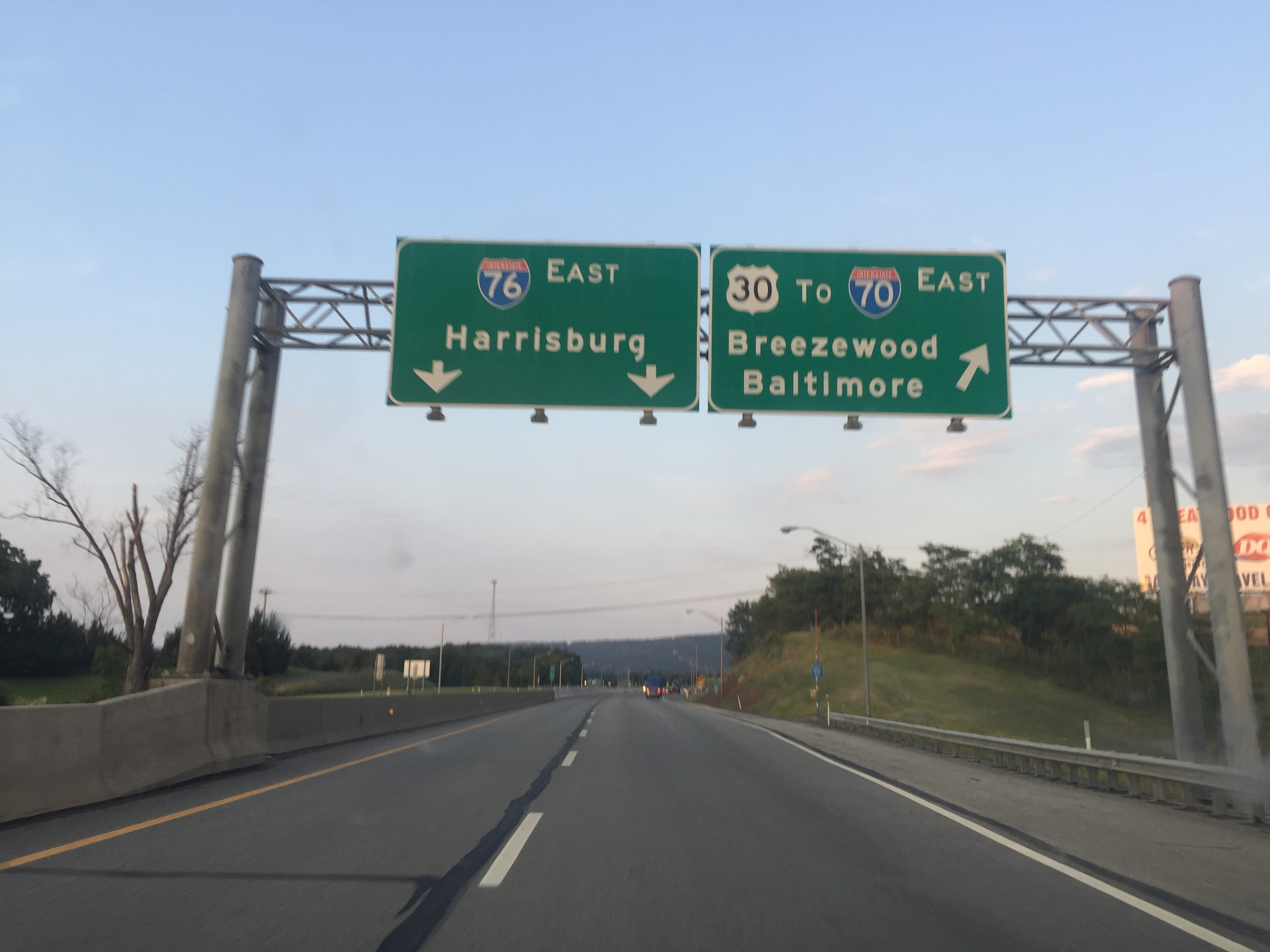
I-70 and I-76 at eastern split

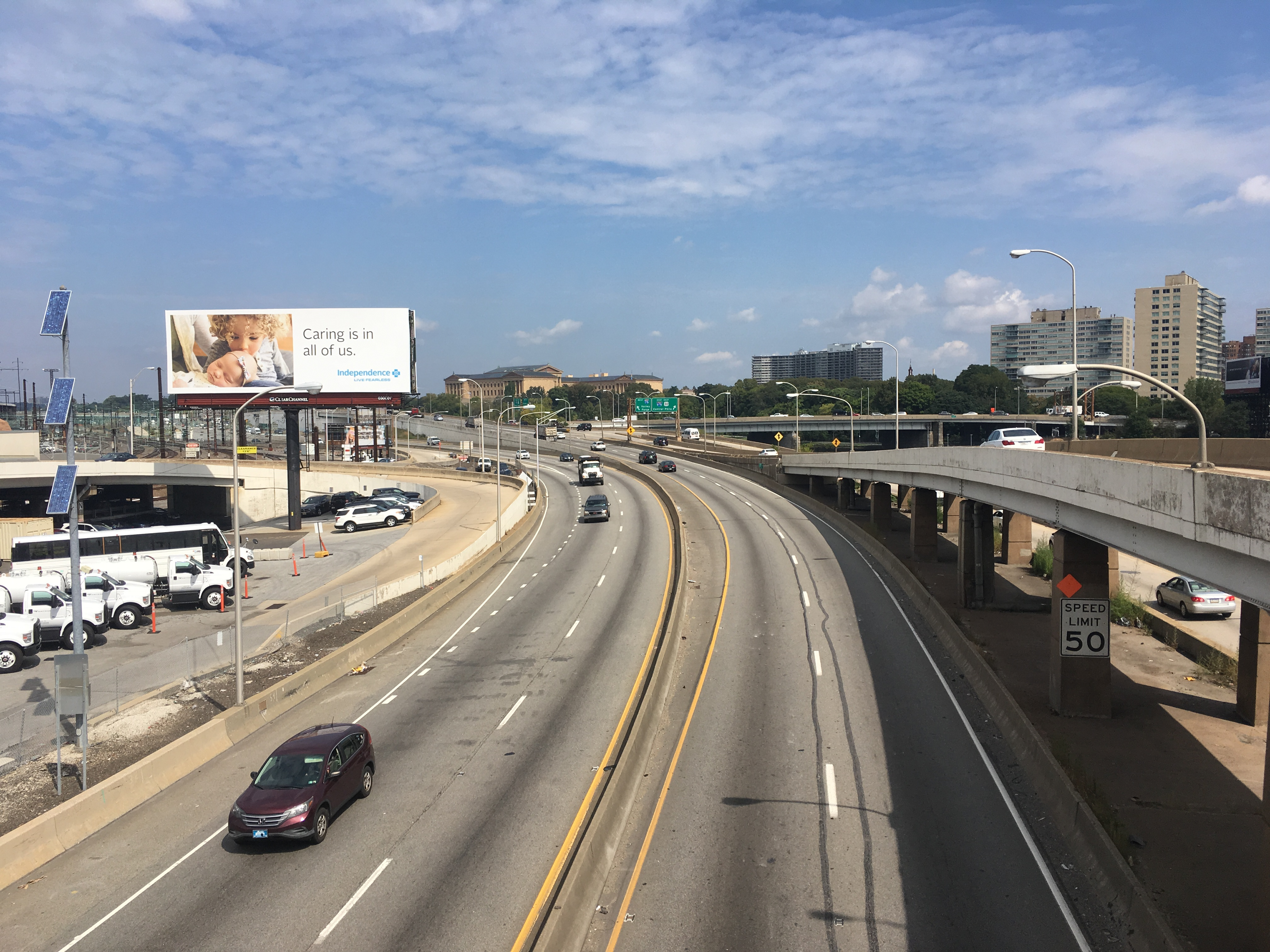
I-76 approaching I-676

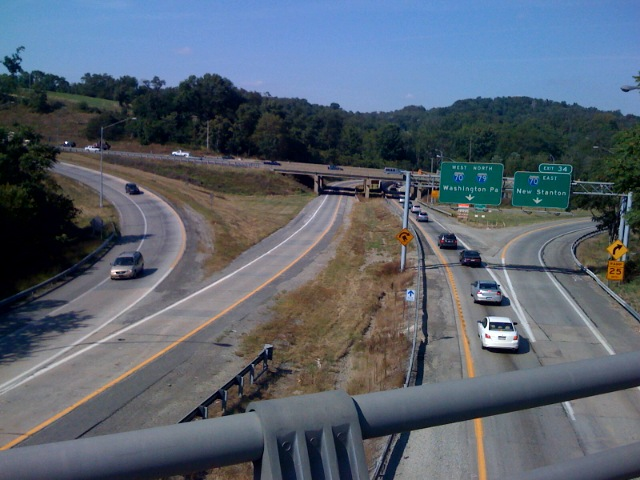
I-79 at I-70
