= Glenwood Bridge =

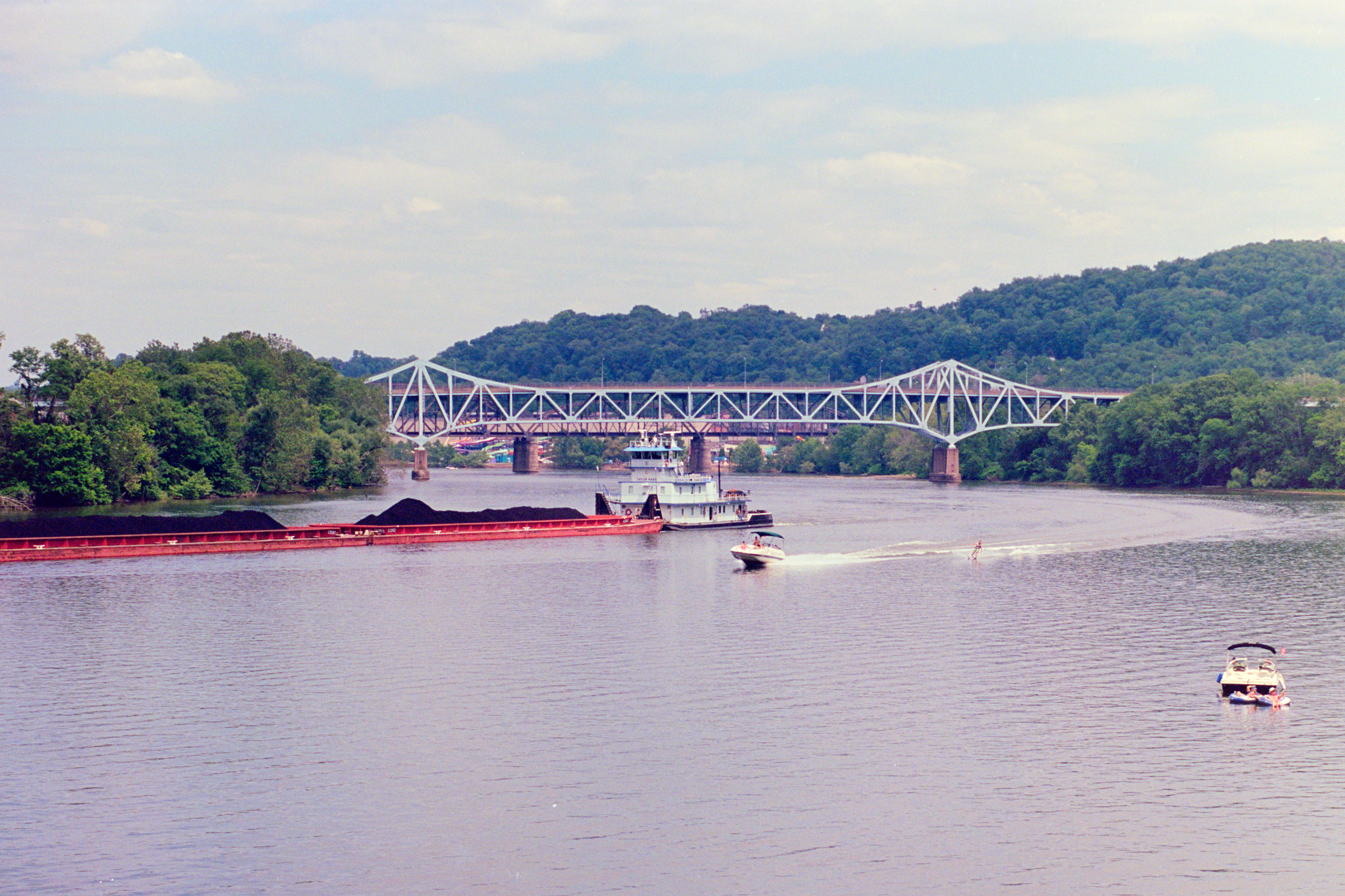
- Coordinates: 40.3976°N 79.9355°W
- Carries: 4 lanes of PA 885
- Crosses: Monongahela River
- Locale: Pittsburgh, Pennsylvania
- Official name: Glenwood Bridge
- Other name: pghe590-12
- Maintained by: Allegheny County

Characteristics
- Design: Cantilever bridge
- Total length: 2,280 feet (690 m)
- Longest span: 557 feet (170 m)
- Clearance below: 50 feet (15 m)

History
- Opened: 1966

Location
- Interactive map of Glenwood Bridge

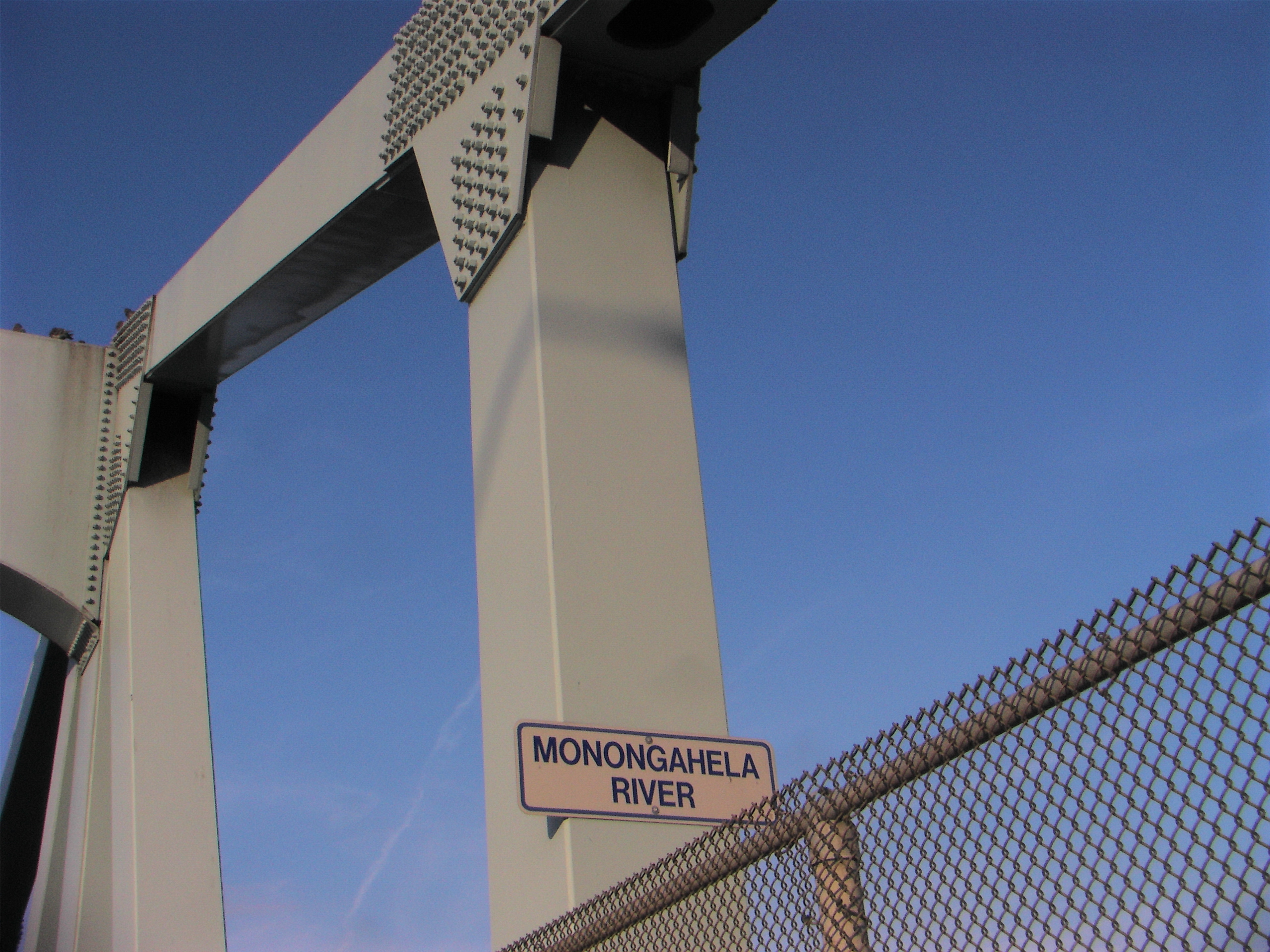
Superstructure

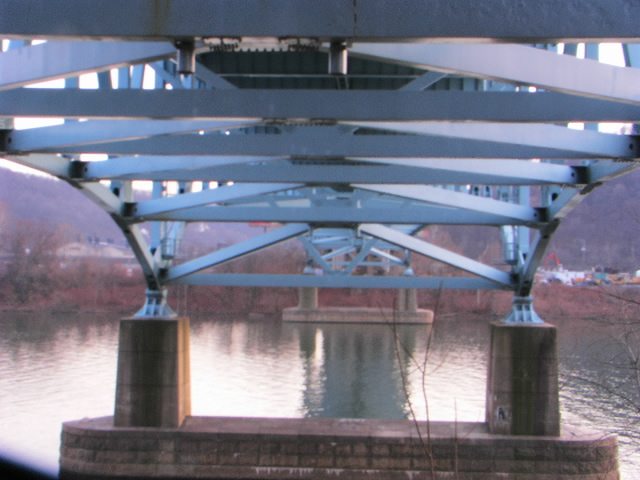
Bridge piers

The Glenwood Bridge is a cantilever bridge in Pittsburgh, Pennsylvania, which carries Pennsylvania Route 885 over the Monongahela River. It started construction on June 3, 1958. It was completed in 1966 to replace an old, decayed, unsafe iron bridge built in 1894, which carried Pittsburgh Railways streetcar tracks and vehicle traffic on a wooden deck.

== History ==
=== Glenwood bridge (1894) ===
The original bridge was built by the Penn Bridge Company of Beaver Falls and carried trolley tracks between Pittsburgh and Homestead. It was later paved with wood to allow vehicle traffic to share the crossing. Permission was given by the Public Utilities Commission on November 8, 1962, for Pittsburgh Railways to convert trolley routes 55 East Pittsburgh via Homestead and Braddock and 98 Glassport to bus service, as the replacement bridge planned did not incorporate trolley tracks. Trolley service 55 across the bridge ended on July 4, 1964.

=== South interchange ===
At the southern end of the bridge is an expressway-style interchange with Pennsylvania Route 837. This interchange was built for a spur of the canceled "East-West Expressway", which was at the proposal stage when the bridge was built.

== See also ==
- List of crossings of the Monongahela River
