= Interstate 579 =

Highway in Pennsylvania

Interstate 579
- I-579 highlighted in red

Route information
- Auxiliary route of I-79
- Maintained by PennDOT
- Length: 2.73 mi (4.39 km)
- Existed: 1962–present
- NHS: Entire route

Major junctions
- South end: PA 885 / Liberty Bridge in Pittsburgh
- PA 380 in Pittsburgh
- North end: I-279 / US 19 Truck / PA 28 in Pittsburgh

Location
- Country: United States
- State: Pennsylvania
- Counties: Allegheny

Highway system
- Interstate Highway System; Main; Auxiliary; Suffixed; Business; Future; Pennsylvania State Route System; Interstate; US; State; Scenic; Legislative
← PA Turnpike 576	I-579	→ PA 580
← PA 478	I-479	→ I-480
← PA 875	I-876	→ PA 876

Interstate 579 (I-579) is a north–south Interstate Highway entirely within Pittsburgh, Pennsylvania. The highway is 2.73 miles (4.39 km) long.

The northern terminus of I-579 is at I-279 beyond the north end of the Veterans Bridge; the southern terminus splits to the Liberty Bridge southbound and Boulevard of the Allies eastbound, which leads to I-376 east. The intersection of I-579 and I-279 is in one direction only; northbound traffic on I-579 can proceed only northbound on I-279 while only southbound traffic on I-279 can exit onto I-579.

I-579 allows Liberty Bridge traffic easy access to I-279, and I-279 southbound traffic easier access to PPG Paints Arena, downtown, and eastern regions of the city, while I-279 southbound continues to Acrisure Stadium, PNC Park, and to westbound I-376 which leads to Pittsburgh International Airport.

== Route description ==
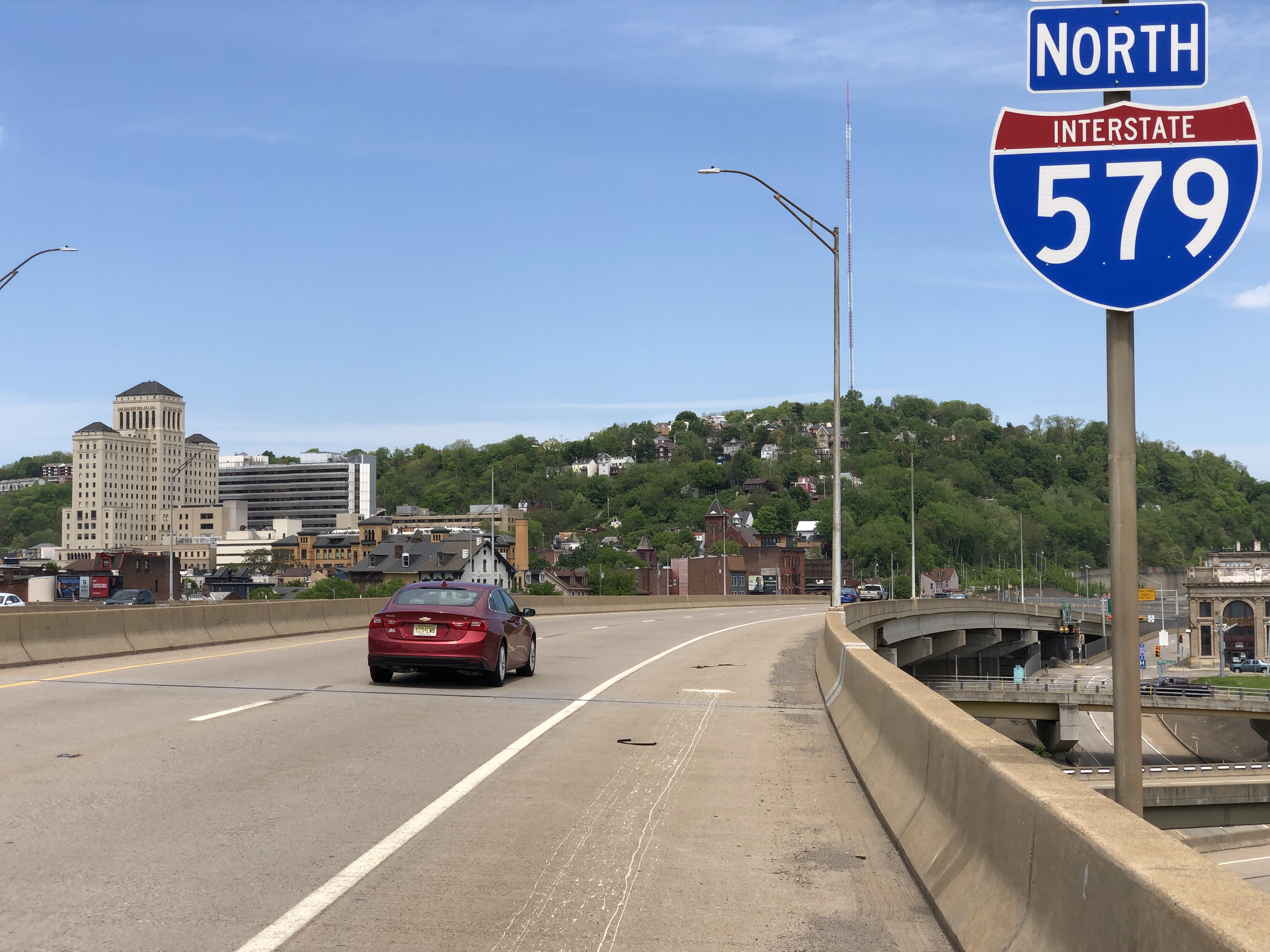
I-579 northbound approaching terminus at I-279/US 19 Truck and PA 28 in Pittsburgh

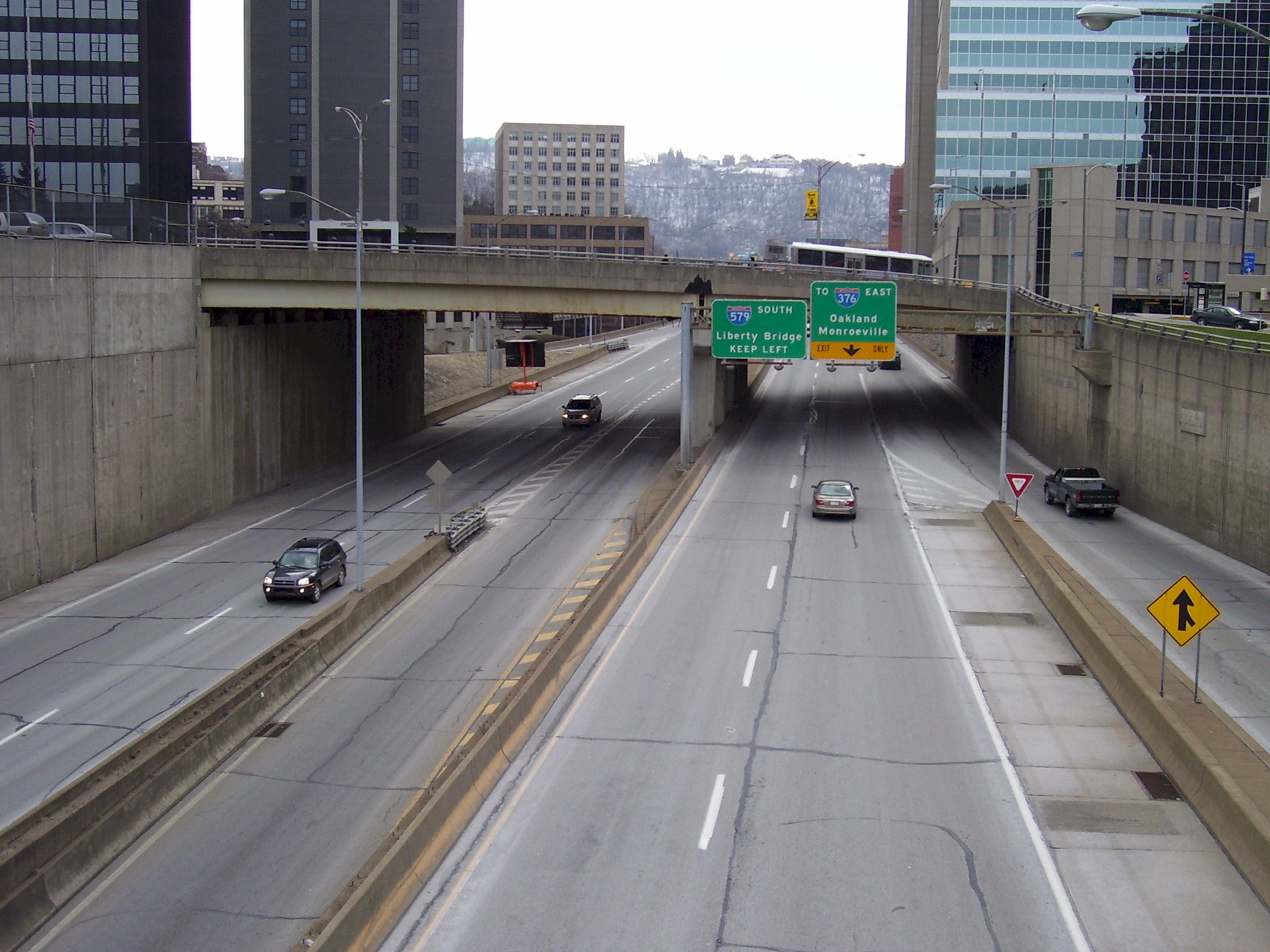
I-579 running through Downtown Pittsburgh

I-579 begins at an interchange with Pennsylvania Route 885 (PA 885; Boulevard of the Allies) and the approach to the Liberty Bridge over the Monongahela River in Downtown Pittsburgh, heading to the north-northeast as a four-lane freeway. At the southern terminus, the highway has a northbound exit and southbound entrance providing access to 6th Avenue and Forbes Avenue near Duquesne University. The road passes several skyscrapers as it comes to an interchange at Centre Avenue with a northbound exit and southbound entrance that provides access to the PPG Paints Arena. Immediately following is a left exit in the northbound direction and a southbound entrance that connects to 7th Avenue that serves the David L. Lawrence Convention Center. At this point, I-579 runs to the west of the former site of the Civic Arena and comes to the PA 380 interchange, a northbound exit and southbound entrance, in addition to a southbound exit and northbound entrance accessing 6th Avenue and 7th Avenue. The freeway turns north as it passes over railroad tracks to the east of Union Station, the Amtrak station serving Pittsburgh. Here, it is seven lanes total with three travel lanes in each direction and two reversible high-occupancy vehicle lanes (HOV lanes) in the center. The HOV lanes connect to Bedford Avenue near the Civic Arena at the south end. The highway turns northwest as it crosses the Allegheny River on the Veterans Bridge. A short distance after the bridge, I-579 ends at an interchange with I-279/US Route 19 Truck (US 19 Truck) and PA 28, at which point the route merges into northbound I-279 with ramps to and from westbound PA 28.

== History ==
Interstate 479
- Location: Pittsburgh
- Existed: 1966–1971

I-579's roots go back to 1966 when the short 0.7-mile (1.1 km) Crosstown Boulevard from the Boulevard of the Allies (PA 885) to Bigelow Boulevard (PA 380) was designated as Interstate 479 (I-479).

Interstate 876
- Location: Pittsburgh
- Existed: 1971–1972
- History: A brief renumbering of I-479

Despite the choice of number, its parent I-79 was only completed in certain areas; there would be no connection of the two routes until 1989. By 1971, with only little progression of I-79 near I-479's northern terminus and easy (but indirect) access to then-I-76 (now I-376 Parkway East) from the southern terminus, I-479 was renumbered as Interstate 876 (I-876).

This was renumbered again on October 2, 1972, as its current designation of I-579; in addition, I-79's designation from Pittsburgh to Robinson Township was "swapped" with I-279's segment south of the Ohio River from PA 51 to the Parkway West interchange. In 1989, both of I-79's auxiliary routes were finally connected with the openings of I-279 (Parkway North) from the Fort Duquesne Bridge/North Shore to its northern terminus at I-79 in Franklin Park and the Veterans Bridge which extended I-579 across the Allegheny River to its new northern terminus at I-279 in Pittsburgh's East Allegheny neighborhood.

In 2019, the I-579 Cap Urban Connector Project began in order to build a pedestrian park over I-579 with the goal of better connecting downtown to the Hill District. The project was completed in 2021 and the park opened to the public on November 22, 2021.

== Exit list ==
The entire route is in Pittsburgh, Allegheny County. All exits are unnumbered.

mi	km	Destinations	Notes
0.000	0.000	Liberty Bridge to US 19 / PA 51 To I-376 east (US 22 east / US 30 east) – Oakland, Monroeville	Southern terminus; access to I-376 via PA 885
0.099	0.159	Centre Avenue – PPG Arena	Northbound exit only
0.164	0.264	7th Avenue – Convention Center	Northbound left exit and southbound entrance
0.278	0.447	PA 380 east (Bigelow Boulevard)	Western terminus of PA 380; northbound exit and southbound entrance
0.536	0.863	7th Avenue / 6th Avenue	Southbound exit and northbound entrance; access to Convention Center and PPG Arena
0.768– 0.967	1.236– 1.556	Veterans Bridge over the Allegheny River	
1.051	1.691	PA 28 north – Etna	Northbound exit and southbound entrance; exit 1A on PA 28
1.575	2.535	I-279 north (US 19 Truck north)	Northern terminus; exit 2A on I-279
1.000 mi = 1.609 km; 1.000 km = 0.621 mi: Incomplete access
