= PA-28 =

PA-28 may refer to:

- Pennsylvania's 28th congressional district
- Pennsylvania Route 28, a highway
- Piper PA-28 Cherokee light aircraft
