= Interstate 279 =

Highway in Pennsylvania, United States

Interstate 279
- Parkway North
- I-279 highlighted in red

Route information
- Auxiliary route of I-79
- Maintained by PennDOT
- Length: 13.32 mi (21.44 km)
- Existed: October 2, 1972–present
- NHS: Entire route

Major junctions
- South end: I-376 / US 22 / US 30 / US 19 Truck in Pittsburgh
- PA 65 in Pittsburgh; I-579 / PA 28 in Pittsburgh US 19 Truck in Pittsburgh; US 19 in Ross Township
- North end: I-79 in Franklin Park

Location
- Country: United States
- State: Pennsylvania
- Counties: Allegheny

Highway system
- Interstate Highway System; Main; Auxiliary; Suffixed; Business; Future; Pennsylvania State Route System; Interstate; US; State; Scenic; Legislative
← PA 278	→ I-280

Interstate 279 (I-279), locally referred to as Parkway North, is a north–south auxiliary Interstate Highway that lies entirely within Allegheny County, Pennsylvania. Its southern end is at I-376 at the Fort Pitt Bridge in Pittsburgh, and the north end is in Franklin Park at I-79. It primarily serves at the main access route between Pittsburgh and its northern suburbs.

== Route description ==
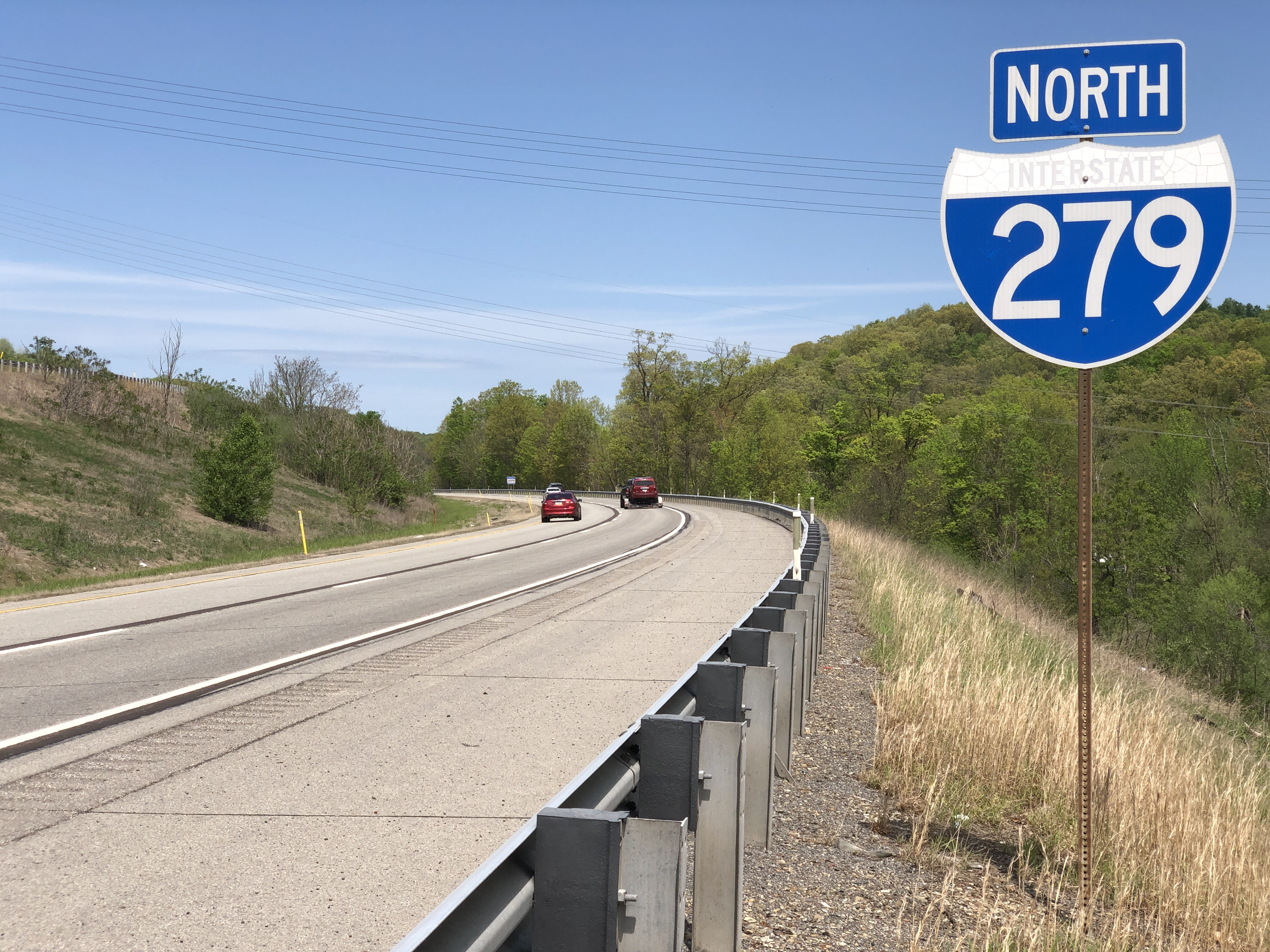
I-279 northbound past the Camp Horne Road interchange in Ohio Township

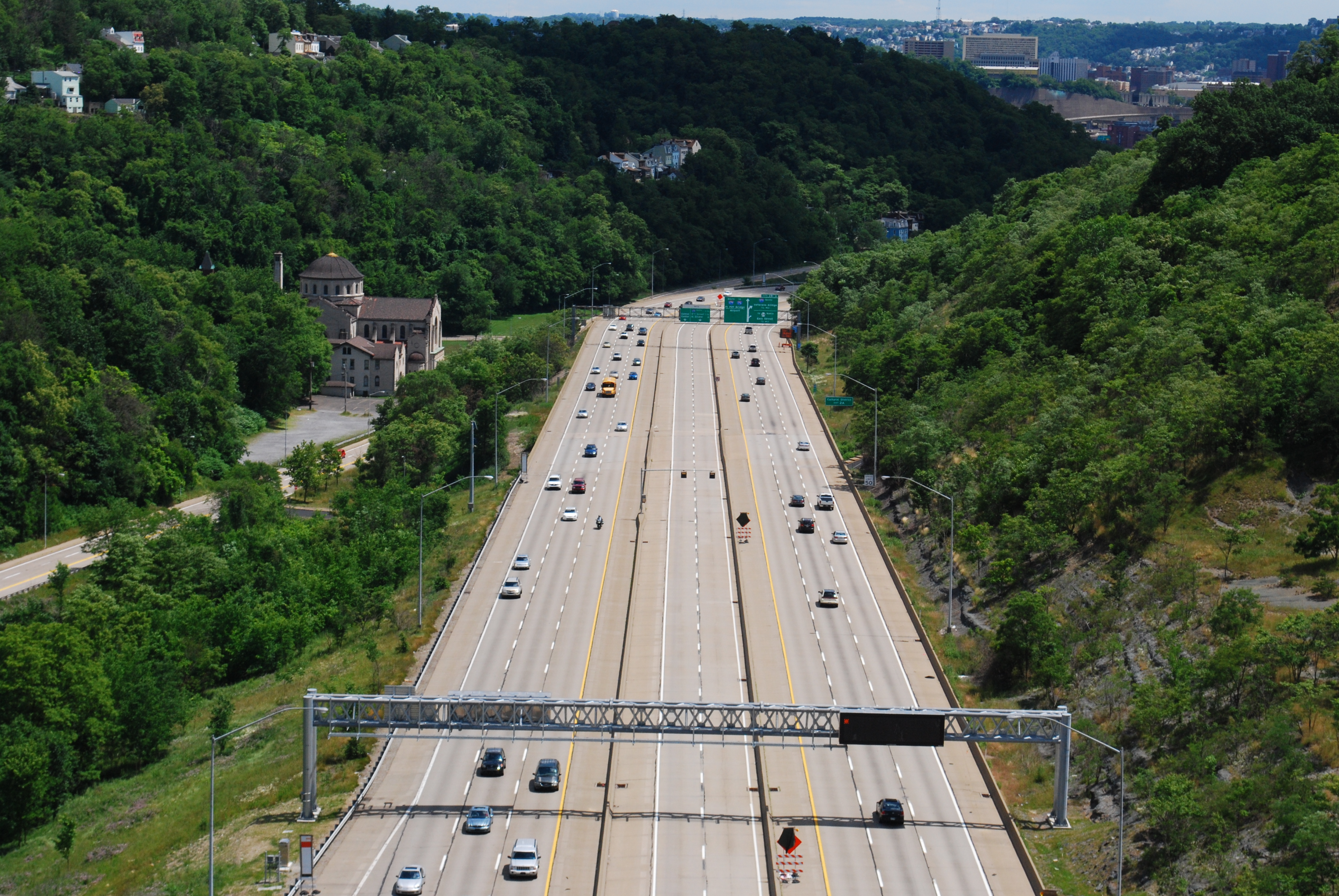
View of I-279 from the Swindell Bridge, roughly two miles (3.2 km) north of Downtown Pittsburgh

The southern terminus of I-279 is at I-376 in Downtown Pittsburgh. It runs concurrently with U.S. Route 19 Truck (US 19 Truck) from its southern terminus to exit 4. (US 19 Truck continues on I-376 west.) I-279 crosses the Fort Duquesne Bridge over the Allegheny River, providing easy access to Heinz Field and PNC Park. I-579 intersects I-279 but is only accessible by southbound traffic; likewise, traffic from I-579 can only head northbound on I-279 by the I-279 Interchange.

The road becomes more suburban and rural as it continues to head north. It has two additional interchanges, Bellevue/West View and Camp Horne Road. After Camp Horne Road, there are no exits until its terminus five miles (8.0 km) later. The Interstate terminates at its parent, I-79. Like the interchange with I-579, this is also a partial interchange. Traffic on I-279 is only permitted to exit northbound on I-79, while only traffic heading southbound on I-79 can exit on to I-279 south.

The section from exit 1B to exit 2B is also known as the North Shore Expressway.

== History ==
I-279 was first proposed in 1958 to run along what is now I-79 between the current I-376 in Carnegie and the current I-279 in Franklin Park. On October 2, 1972, its route was swapped with I-79, putting I-279 onto its current route, although only the downtown portion and the Fort Duquesne Bridge were built at the time.

In 1973, the designation was extended from downtown over Parkway West (what is now I-376) to I-79. This section became part of I-376 in 2009, and the I-279 signs were taken down there.

I-279 from Fort Duquesne Bridge to its current northern terminus in Franklin Park was approved on June 4, 1975, but constructed from 1985 to 1989, opening in its entirety with a Governor Bob Casey Sr. ribbon-cutting on September 16, 1989. From 1997 to 2003, various ramps, the Fort Pitt Bridge, and nearby tunnels were reconstructed. A direct connection from I-279 south to I-376 east was opened in 2002.

=== Unearthed cemetery ===
During the last phases of construction of I-279 in 1987, a long-forgotten cemetery dating from the 19th century was unearthed near the site of the current I-279/I-579 split. Archeologists spent four months exhuming the graves for cultural studies at the Smithsonian Institution, putting the Pennsylvania Department of Transportation (PennDOT) significantly behind schedule. It was determined that the graves belonged to Swiss and German immigrants that were members of a local church located next door to the cemetery in what was then Allegheny City, with 727 graves buried at the 0.5-acre (0.20 ha) site between 1833 and 1861. The graves were forgotten about by 1911 when the church did an addition to the building and had the foundation unintentionally go through about 15 graves, with the churchyard housing the cemetery later becoming a parking lot in 1950. Aside from a pair of stillborn twins, none of the graves were identified, and archeologists were unable to find any living descendants due to the obscurity of the cemetery. The remains were reburied with one marker at the church's current cemetery in the Troy Hill section of Pittsburgh in 2003 after the Smithsonian Institution finished studying them; the congregation itself disbanded in 1984 after PennDOT bought the church property via eminent domain for I-279 and only had 21 members at that point. Today, it is the largest number of 19th century graves (Native American graves notwithstanding) ever studied archeologically in the US.

== High-occupancy vehicle lanes ==
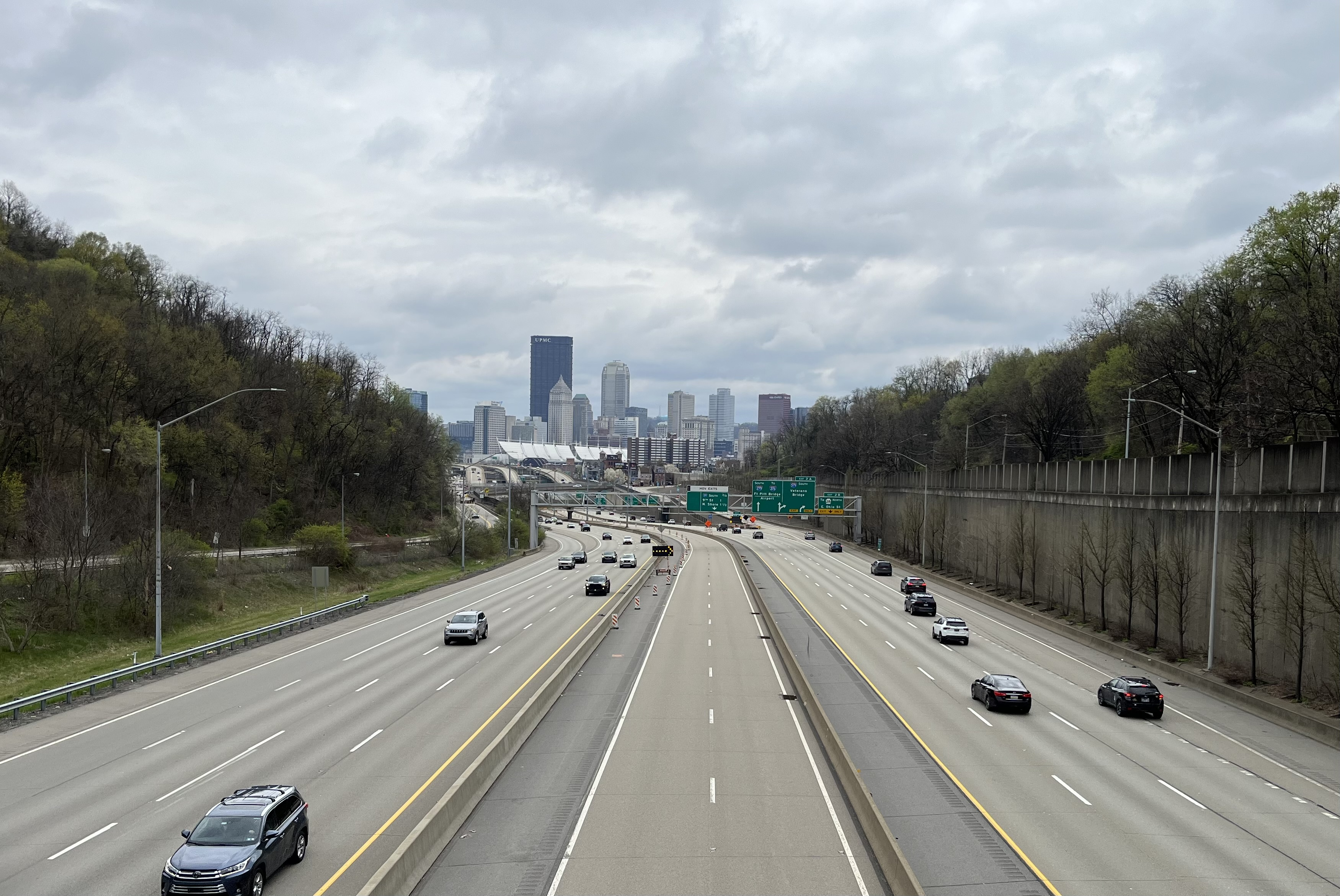
I-279, looking south toward downtown Pittsburgh, the HOV lanes can be seen in the center

Interstate 279 includes two reversible high-occupancy vehicle (HOV) lanes in the median between Downtown Pittsburgh and the North Hills. The facility extends 4.1 miles (6.6 km)–5.3 miles (8.5 km) including ramps–and is separated from general traffic by concrete barriers, with independent traffic-control systems. It is the only PennDOT-owned HOV facility in Pennsylvania.

The lanes operate inbound toward Downtown on weekdays from 6 to 9 a.m. and outbound from 4 to 7 p.m. During weekends, the lanes are opened to general traffic in the outbound direction from Friday evening to early Monday morning.

In 1995, a head-on collision in the HOV lanes resulted in six fatalities after the lanes were improperly opened in both directions. A PennDOT employee later pleaded guilty to involuntary manslaughter and reckless endangerment in connection with the incident. Following the crash, safety measures were revised, including the installation of automated gates at the downtown access points in 2006.

Designed to handle 14,400 vehicles per weekday, usage peaked in 1992 at about 4,800 per day, and had fallen to approximately 3,500 vehicles per day by 2006.

Pittsburgh Regional Transit operates three "Flyer" bus routes using the HOV lanes during weekday peak commute periods.

I-279 HOV Flyer routes
Route	Route Name	Destination	Service	Notes
O1	Ross Flyer	Ross to East Busway at Penn Station	Weekday peak periods	Express to Ross Park Mall. No stops on McKnight Road
O5	Thompson Run Flyer	North Park to East Busway at Penn Station	Weekday peak periods	Makes most stops on local side roads - follows Babcock Boulevard and Thompson Run Road
O12	McKnight Flyer	McCandless to East Busway at Penn Station	Weekday peak periods	Primarily follows McKnight Road

== Exit list ==
The entire route is in Allegheny County.

Location	mi	km	Old exit	New exit	Destinations	Notes
Pittsburgh	0.000	0.000	8 (Note: Sequential exit number before replaced with milepost-based exit number); 6A (Note: Milepost-based exit number from former southern terminus at I-79)	–	I-376 (US 22 / US 30 / US 19 Truck south / Fort Pitt Bridge) – Downtown Pittsburgh, Monroeville, Pittsburgh International Airport	Southern terminus; southern end of US 19 Truck concurrency; exit 70C on I-376
Pittsburgh	0.313	0.504	10; 6C	1A	Fort Duquesne Boulevard – Convention Center, Strip District	Southbound left exit and northbound entrance
Pittsburgh	0.236– 0.496	0.380– 0.798	Fort Duquesne Bridge over the Allegheny River			
Pittsburgh	0.494– 0.803	0.795– 1.292	11A (Note: Northbound) / 12 (Note: Southbound); 7A	1B	North Shore	Left exit northbound; no northbound entrance
Pittsburgh	0.494– 0.803	0.795– 1.292	–	♦	North Shore	Southbound left exit and northbound entrance; southern end of HOV lane
Pittsburgh	0.494– 0.803	0.795– 1.292	11B / 12; 7B	1C	PA 65 north (Ohio River Boulevard) to US 19	Left exit and entrance northbound; US 19 not signed southbound; southern terminus of PA 65
Pittsburgh	1.020	1.642	13; 7C	1D	PA 28 north / Chestnut Street / Ohio Street – Etna	Northbound exit and southbound entrance
Pittsburgh	1.098	1.767	–	♦	9th Street	Southbound left exit and northbound entrance
Pittsburgh	1.237	1.991	–	♦	I-279 south (US 19 Truck south)	Southbound exit only
Pittsburgh	1.677	2.699	–	♦	PPG Arena	Southbound left exit and northbound entrance to HOV spur on I-579
Pittsburgh	1.845	2.969	14; 8A	2A	I-579 south (Veterans Bridge)	Northern terminus of I-579; southbound exit and northbound entrance
Pittsburgh	1.910	3.074	15; 8B	2B	To PA 28 / East Ohio Street	Southbound exit and northbound entrance; exit originally designated as East Street until December 2017
Pittsburgh	2.903	4.672	16; 9	3	Hazlett Street	Northbound exit and entrance
Pittsburgh	3.834	6.170	17; 10	4	East Street	Southbound exit and entrance; exit originally designated as Venture Street until December 2017
Pittsburgh	4.081	6.568	18; 11	4	US 19 Truck north (McKnight Road) / Evergreen Road	Northern end of US 19 Truck concurrency; northbound exit and southbound entrance HOV: northbound exit and southbound left entrance
Ross Township	5.469	8.802	19; 12	5	US 19 (Perrysville Avenue)	HOV: northbound left exit and southbound left entrance
Ross Township	5.535	8.908	Northern terminus of HOV lanes			
Ross Township	7.304	11.755	20; 14	7	Bellevue, West View	
Ohio Township	8.410	13.535	21; 15	8	Green Belt (Camp Horne Road)	
Franklin Park	13.307	21.416	20	–	I-79 north – Erie	Northern terminus; exit 72 on I-79
1.000 mi = 1.609 km; 1.000 km = 0.621 mi: HOV only; Incomplete access
