= Veterans Bridge (Pittsburgh) =

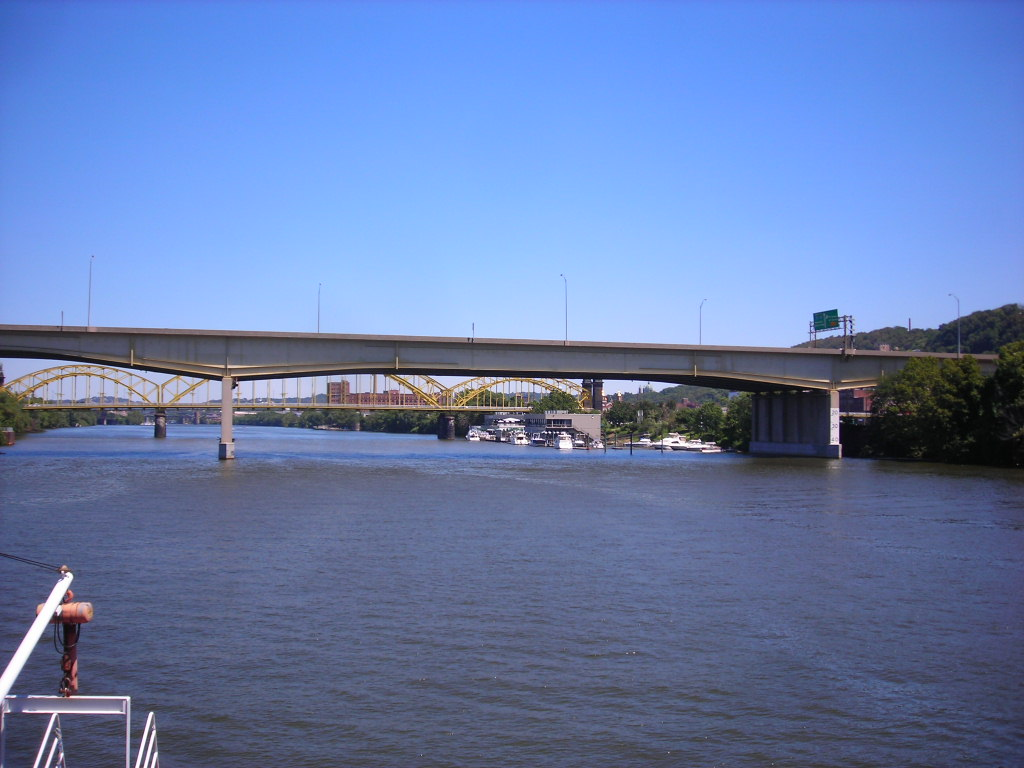
- Coordinates: 40.4499°N 79.9934°W
- Carries: I-579
- Crosses: Allegheny River
- Locale: Pittsburgh, Pennsylvania
- Maintained by: PennDOT

Characteristics
- Design: Steel girder bridge
- Total length: 1,050 feet (320 m)
- Longest span: 410 feet (120 m)

History
- Opened: 1987

The Veterans Bridge is a steel and welded girder bridge that carries Interstate 579 over the Allegheny River in Pittsburgh, Pennsylvania. Completed in 1988 it cost $420 million (or $1.12 billion in 2024 terms). It opened on November 11, 1988 complete with 107th National Guard howitzers firing ceremoniously from the deck, as the last link in I-579. The bridge, 1,050 feet (320 m) in length, has a main span of 410 feet (120 m) and is 51 feet (16 m) above the water. The roadway atop the structure is seven lanes wide, with six lanes dedicated to northbound and southbound traffic (three per direction) and one lane designed for reversible High Occupancy Vehicle (HOV-2) movements.

== See also ==
- List of crossings of the Allegheny River

== See also ==
- List of crossings of the Allegheny River
