= Perrysville, Pennsylvania =

Community in Allegheny County, Pennsylvania

Coordinates: 40°32′5.25″N 80°1′58.2″W

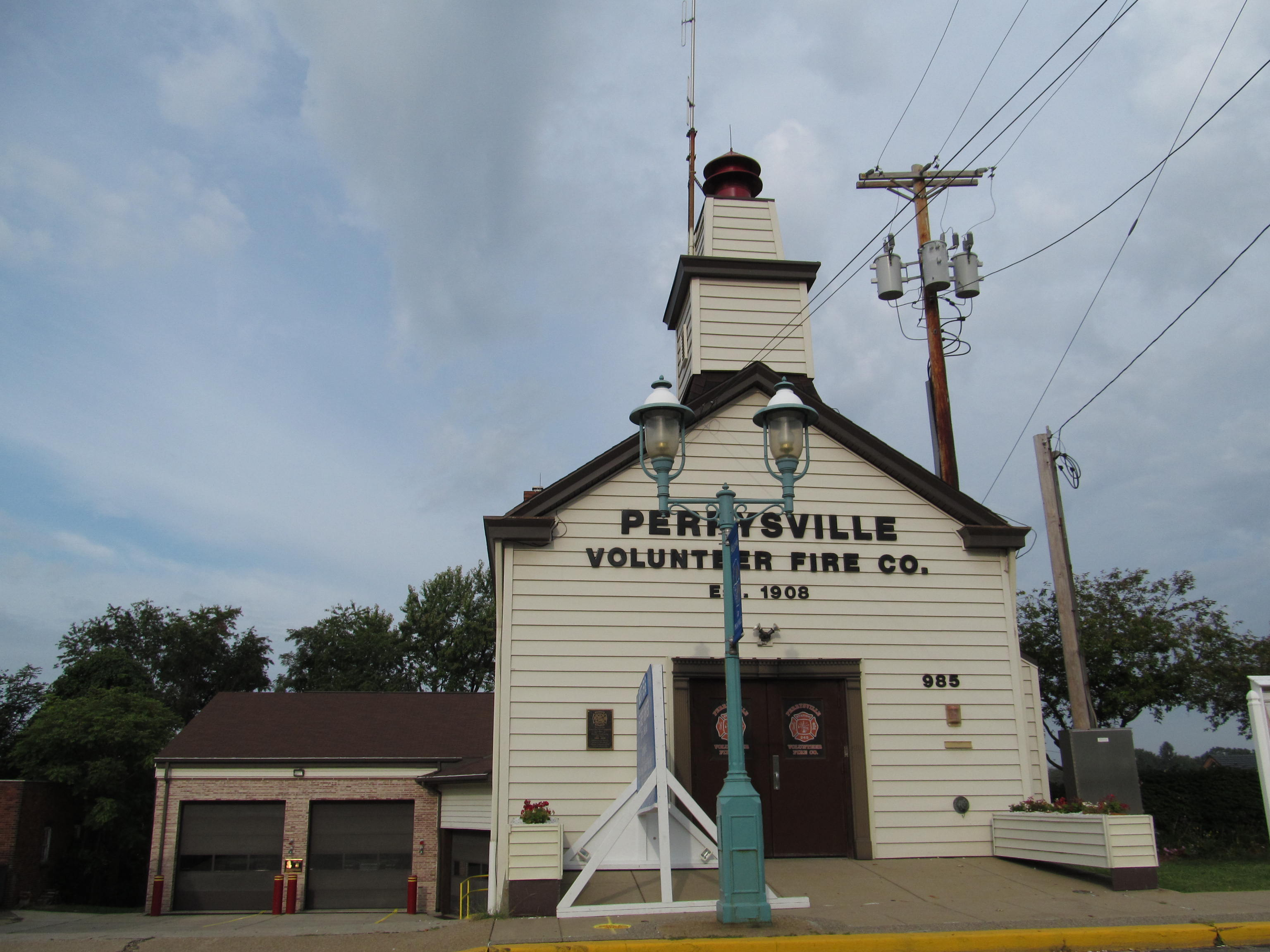
Perrysville Volunteer Fire Department

Perrysville is a community in Ross Township, Allegheny County, Pennsylvania, about 7 miles (11 km) north of Pittsburgh on Perry Highway (U.S. Route 19). It is a populated place of Allegheny County. It was historically a stagecoach stop and known as the village of Perryville. Like communities to the north and south of it, Perrysville's main street is lined with small businesses interspersed with residences and several churches.

== History ==
Historically known as the "village of Perrysville", before the turn of the 20th century, it was a toll plaza of the Perry Plank Road north of Pittsburgh, and was a stopping point for merchants and farmers taking their goods to the markets in Pittsburgh. It was a stagecoach stop and an early home to hotels, churches, merchants and inns. It was such a center of activity that Western Pennsylvania historians sometimes referred to Pittsburgh as "the town south of Perrysville".

The first sermon preached in the area was by a Mr. Stockton in 1799, on what was called Hiland Hill. During the 1780s and 1790s, that hill had been a retreat and fortification against Indian attack. It was named after Barnabas Hilands, who disappeared while traveling from his home in Perrysville to Federal Street in what is now Pittsburgh. He was assumed to have been killed by Indians. In 1836, Hiland Presbyterian Church was incorporated on the site. In 1864, a number of Roman Catholics were meeting in a Perrysville home. Land for a new church was purchased in 1864. The church, built with locally made bricks, opened in 1867 as St. Teresa of Avila Church. Each of these congregations still exists today.

Also still in existence is the Perrysville Volunteer Fire Company, formed in 1908 after a dispute with another fire company. In the 1920s, it began holding an annual parade and carnival, said to be one of the largest in Pennsylvania, with marching bands and drill teams attending from throughout the state. The annual parade still takes place, drawing participants and spectators from Pittsburgh's northern suburbs.

In January 1902, condemned killers Jack and Ed Biddle escaped from the recently built Allegheny County Jail in Pittsburgh, accompanied by the warden's wife Kate Soffel, who was in love with one of the boys. They fled to Perrysville, where they hid in a school, stole a horse and a shotgun, and bought or stole some food. They continued north, and were apprehended and killed a few days later. The incident is the basis of the 1984 film Mrs. Soffel.
