= Wallace Williams =

Wallace Williams may refer to:

- Wallace Williams (runner), American long-distance runner
- Wallace Williams (politician) (died 1974), American politician from Maryland
- Bucky Williams (1906–2009), Negro league baseball player
