= Edwin Ewing =

Edwin Ewing may refer to:

- Edwin Hickman Ewing (1809–1902), member of the U.S. House of Representatives from Tennessee
- Edwin Evans Ewing (1824–1901), American writer, poet, and newspaperman
