= 1909 Maryland Comptroller election =

- November 5, 1909
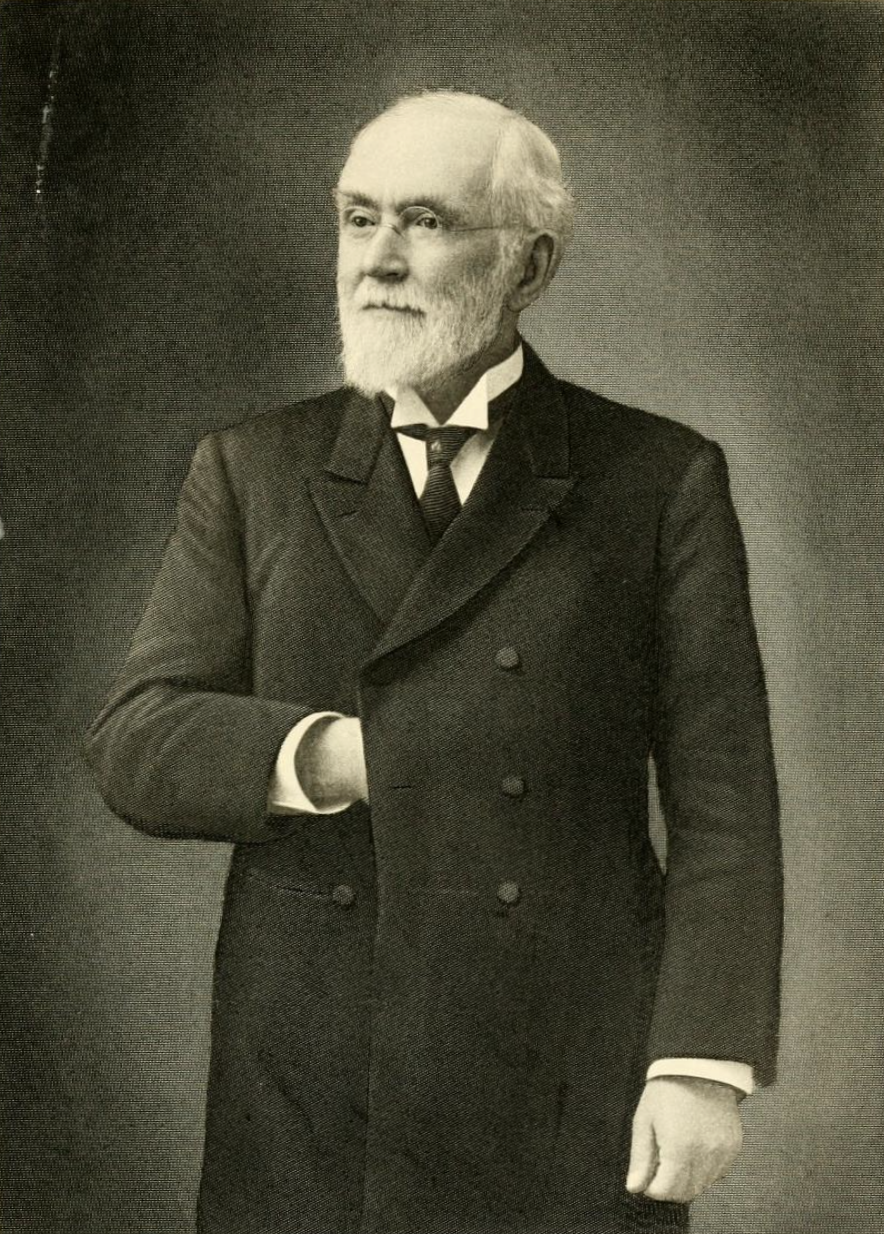

Nominee	Joshua W. Hering	Frank E. Williams
Party	Democratic	Republican
Popular vote	102,562	92,823
Percentage	50.66%	45.85%
- County results Hering: 40–50% 50–60% 60–70% 70–80% Williams: 40–50% 50–60% 60–70%
Comptroller before election
Joshua W. Hering
Democratic
Elected Comptroller
Joshua W. Hering
Democratic

The 1909 Maryland comptroller election was held on November 5, 1909, in order to elect the comptroller of Maryland. Democratic nominee and incumbent comptroller Joshua W. Hering defeated Republican nominee Frank E. Williams, Progressive nominee Richard A. Harris and Socialist nominee Mark Jackson.

== General election ==
On election day, November 5, 1909, Democratic nominee Joshua W. Hering won re-election by a margin of 9,739 votes against his foremost opponent Republican nominee Frank E. Williams, thereby retaining Democratic control over the office of comptroller. Hering was sworn in for his fourth overall term on January 17, 1910.

=== Results ===
Maryland Comptroller election, 1909
Party	Candidate	Votes	%
Democratic	Joshua W. Hering (incumbent)	102,562	50.66
Republican	Frank E. Williams	92,823	45.85
Progressive	Richard A. Harris	4,488	2.22
Socialist	Mark Jackson	2,589	1.27
Total votes		202,462	100.00
Democratic hold			
