= Compass in the Blood =

2001 novel by William E. Coles Jr.

- Author: William E. Coles, Jr.
- Language: English
- Genre: Novel
- Publisher: Atheneum Books
- Publication date: 2001
- Publication place: United States
- Media type: Print (hardback)
- Pages: 272 pp
- ISBN: 0-689-83181-1
- OCLC: 43798298
- Preceded by: Another Kind of Monday

Compass in the Blood is a young-adult novel by the American writer William E. Coles, Jr. (1932–2005) set in 1890's Pittsburgh, Pennsylvania.

== Synopsis ==
It tells the story of Dee Armstrong, a freshman journalism student at the University of Pittsburgh, who is inspired to investigate one of the city's most notorious crimes. In 1902 Kate Soffel, the wife of the warden of the Allegheny County Jail, conducted an adulterous affair with a prisoner, Ed Biddle, and helped him and his brother Jack in a daring jailbreak.
