= Jack and Ed Biddle =

American criminal duo

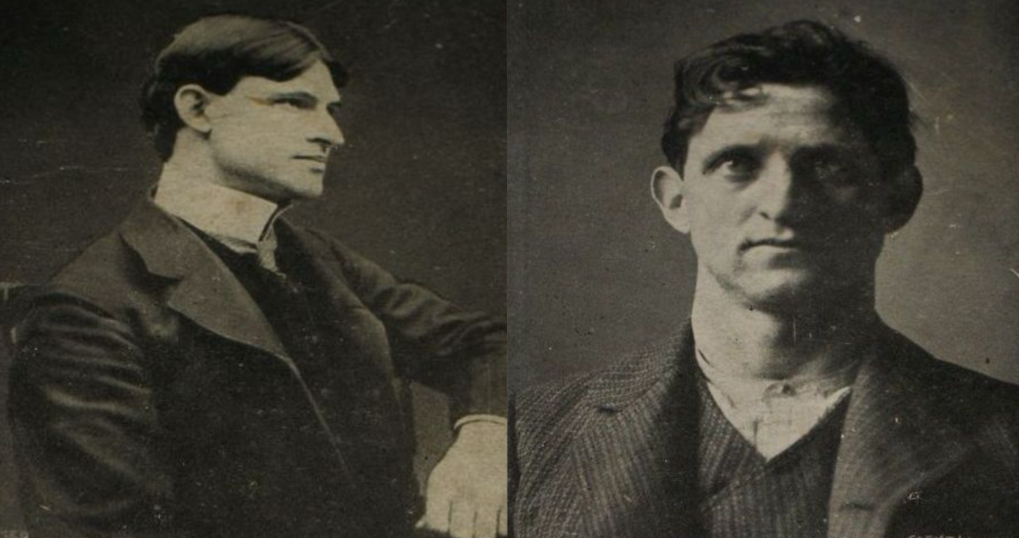
Ed Biddle (left), and Jack Biddle, c. 1901

Brothers John E. Biddle (January 8, 1872 – February 1, 1902) and Edward C. Biddle (December 27, 1876 – February 1, 1902) were condemned prisoners who escaped from the Allegheny County Jail in Pittsburgh, Pennsylvania using tools and weapons supplied to them by Kate Soffel, the warden's wife, (June 27, 1867 – August 30, 1909) who fled with them. During the subsequent pursuit and capture all three were wounded, the brothers mortally.

The incident is the basis of the 1984 film Mrs. Soffel.

== Background ==
Jack and Ed Biddle were born (January 8, 1872 and December 27, 1876, respectively) in Anderdon Township, Essex County, Ontario (now part of Amherstburg, Ontario) to George and Mary Ann (née McQuaide) Biddle. (Note: "Ontario Births 1869–1912" and 1881 Canada Census, as found at familysearch.com) Soffel was born Anna Katharina Dietrich in Pittsburgh, Pennsylvania.

The Biddles were arrested on April 12, 1901 at a house in Allegheny County, Pennsylvania as leaders of the Chloroform Gang, which for more than one year had been overpowering victims with chloroform or ether and then robbing them. Tried and convicted on December 12, 1901 of the murder of a Mt. Washington shopkeeper, they were imprisoned in Allegheny County Jail to await hanging.

== Escape ==
Kate Soffel, wife of warden Peter Soffel, frequently came into contact with prisoners in her efforts to rehabilitate them. She developed an infatuation with Ed Biddle, and she eventually agreed to help the brothers escape by smuggling saws and guns to them.

The brothers sawed openings in the bars of their cells, and at 4 am on January 29, 1902 one of them called out that his brother was ill. As a guard approached, Jack Biddle lunged through the opening between the bars, and seizing the guard by the waist, threw him over a railing to the stone floor 16 feet below. Ed Biddle shot and wounded a second guard.

The Biddles locked the wounded guards, and the third guard on duty, in the prison "dungeon". After changing from their prison jumpsuits into the guards' street clothes, they left the prison to rendezvous with Soffel. Only at the guards' 6 AM shift change was the escape discovered.

== Pursuit and recapture ==
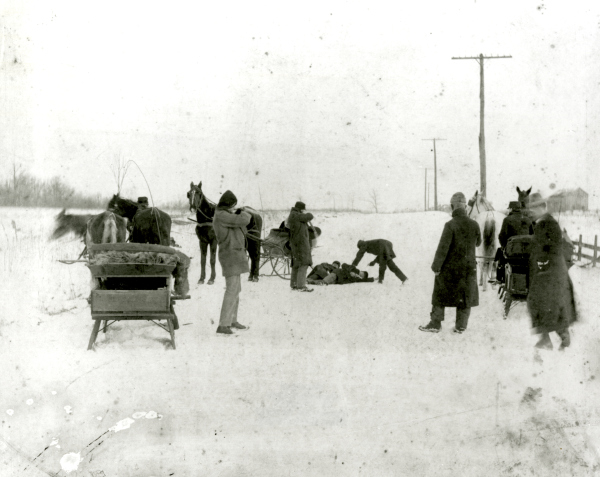
Capture of the Biddle Brothers, January 31, 1902, showing the sleigh in which they and Soffel had attempted to escape authorities.

The three took a trolley to West View, Pennsylvania, then walked a mile to a farm on U.S. Route 19 in Pennsylvania, where they stole a sleigh and a shotgun and started for Butler County.

Meanwhile, Charles "Buck" McGovern (one of the detectives who originally arrested the Biddles) gathered a posse, assuming the fugitives were headed for Canada and would follow back roads.

McGovern stationed his men at the Graham Farm in Butler County and waited. After some time the brothers approached, bringing the sleigh to a halt as they realized they were surrounded. One of the detectives recounted the story:

The Biddles were sitting on the right side of the cutter. Mrs. Soffel was on the left side. "Hold up your hands and surrender," Detective McGovern commanded. Ed Biddle jumped up from his seat and, raising a shotgun, fired it at McGovern. He aimed badly, and the shot scattered on the road alongside of McGovern. Detectives McGovern and Roach discharged their Winchesters at Ed Biddle. Both shots took effect. Jack Biddle raised from the seat, and discharged his revolver at the three officers. Detective Swineheart settled himself and fired with a revolver at the man. The ball took effect in Biddle's arm. Then all the detectives opened fire on the Biddles. The shots knocked them out of the sleigh. Ed fell sprawling on the snow, and Jack fell on him.

However, this account conflicts with that of Jack Biddle:

When we saw the officers coming towards us on the road yesterday evening we knew it was all up. We did not fire a shot at the officers, but agreed to kill ourselves. I shot myself in the mouth. 'Ed' shot himself over the heart. and [Kate Soffel] shot herself in the breast. We knew we had no chance to get away, and we knew we would swing if taken back, and that is why we wanted to kill ourselves.

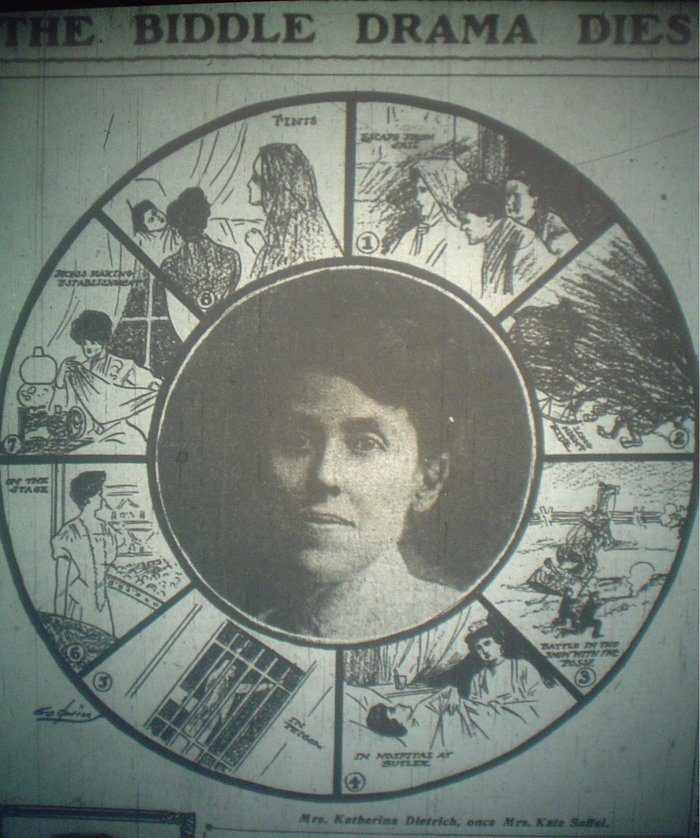
The Pittsburgh Dispatch the day after Soffel's death

What precisely happened during the showdown is uncertain, but the police may have opened fire on Soffel and the Biddles when they made their attempt at suicide. Reporters later described Jack Biddle as "riddled with buckshot", mentioning that the Biddles were armed with a shotgun, but stated that the police only carried revolvers and rifles.

As detectives approached the wounded brothers, Kate Soffel lay near them; she had shot herself. The detectives believed Ed Biddle to be reaching for a pistol, and so they shot him again, with McGovern firing at the brothers until his rifle's magazine became empty.

All three were taken to the jail at Butler, where the brothers were placed in adjoining cells. There Jack denied killing the Mt. Washington shopkeeper and a detective who had been shot dead during the Biddles' arrest.

== Death and burial of Biddle brothers ==
Ed had sustained three gunshot wounds, and Jack was described as "riddled with bullets." Jack died at 7:35 pm on February 1 – the third day after the shooting – and Ed, who had been largely unconscious most of the time, died at 11 pm.

The brothers' bodies were returned to Pittsburgh where they were met by a large crowd: They had become local celebrities. Thousands came to their viewing, some believing they were innocent. They were buried in the Calvary Cemetery on 5 Feb, 1902. Originally the grave was unmarked due to the fact that Ed Biddle committed suicide and suicide was prohibited by Catholic Church, therefore the Biddle brothers can only be buried in the westernmost slope section, Section 1 within Calvary Cemetery.

In 1983, during the filming of Mrs. Soffel, Ron Nyswaner, a resident of Greene County, Pennsylvania and a screenwriter, arranged for MGM to erect a headstone. The headstone is inscribed with the names and dates of death as well as the last verse of the poem penned by Ed Biddle----it's noteworthy here that this poem was written to Julia Foster, daughter of Biddle's one-time spiritual adviser Rev. F.N.Foster, not Mrs. Soffel as shown in the film.

== Soffel's later life ==
After recovering from her bullet wound and possible pneumonia Soffel was returned to Pittsburgh, where she confessed to aiding the Biddles' escape and received a two-year sentence on 10 May, 1902 at the Western Penitentiary, but her sentence was reduced for five months due to her good behavior, and she was released in Dec. 1903.

Removed from his job as warden, Soffel's husband divorced his wife in 1903, and remarried in Feb 1907, and moved with the couple's children to Canton, Ohio; he died on 11 September, 1936.

Kate Soffel briefly attempted to star in the drama A Desperate Chance after she was released in Dec 1903, but the production was, according to the New York Times, "enjoined by the Fayette County Court". Soffel later returned to Pittsburgh and resided in the North Side (then called City of Allegheny) and took up dressmaking, and sometimes used her maiden name of Dietrich, or called herself Katherine Miller (Miller being the name of a brother-in-law). She died of typhoid fever on 30 Aug. 1909, and was buried in her mother's unmarked grave two days later in Smithfield East End Cemetery.

== Legacy ==
The Biddle Boys and Mrs. Soffel case sometimes was regarded as the first "Crime of the Century", and it caused a huge sensation that a wife of the warden would escape with two notorious criminals back then, and inspired a number of works and plays about them, and one of the more famous books was The Biddle Boys and Mrs. Soffel: The Great Pittsburgh Tragedy and Romance by Arthur Forrest, just a few years removed from the case in 1902.

In 1984, the movie Mrs. Soffel was released by MGM and starred Diane Keaton as Kate Soffel, Mel Gibson as Ed Biddle, and Matthew Modine as Jack Biddle, and the production took place in the old Allegheny County Jail for three days, and then elsewhere in Wisconsin and Toronto. The movie was one of the movies that shows then-interior scenes of the old Allegheny County Jail before it was closed in 1995, and prisoners there were used as extras in the movie.

In 2001, a lyric opera titled The Biddle Boys and Mrs. Soffel by Jeremy Beck was performed in Pittsburgh, and excerpts of the play can be accessed at both Beckmusic.org website and YouTube.

In 2002, University of Pittsburgh emeritus professor William E. Coles Jr. published the book Compass in the Blood, fictionalizing his own experience in doing research on Biddle-Soffel case and searching for Mrs. Soffel's final resting place.
