= Vilsack =

Vilsack is a surname. Notable people with the surname include:

- Christie Vilsack (born 1950), American literacy advocate and politician
- Leopold Vilsack, co-founder Iron City Brewing Company
- Norman A. Vilsack Frauenheim (1897 – 1989), American pianist and music teacher
- Tom Vilsack (born 1950), American politician and lawyer
