= Cecil Whig =

Newspaper in Elkton, Maryland, US

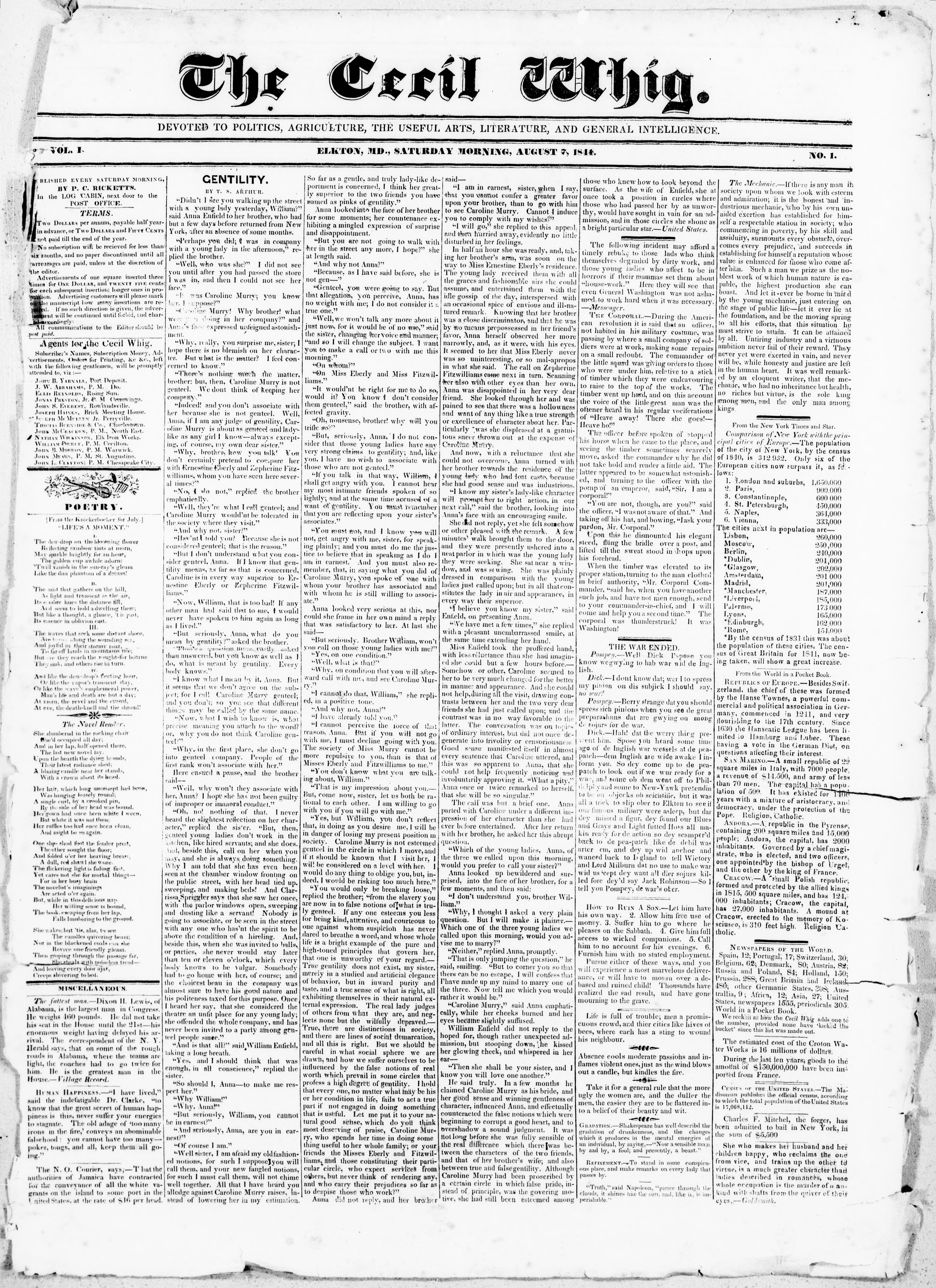
- The cover page of the August 7, 1841 inaugural issue of The Cecil Whig
- Type: Twice Weekly newspaper
- Format: Tall Tabloid
- Owner: Adams MultiMedia
- Founder: Palmer Chamberlain Ricketts
- Publisher: Jim Normandin
- Editor-in-chief: Erik Halberg
- Editor: Carl Hamilton
- News editor: Jane Bellmyer
- Founded: August 7, 1841
- Headquarters: 601 N Bridge St; Elkton, Maryland 21921; United States
- Circulation: 5,554 (as of 2021)
- ISSN: 1046-2058
- OCLC number: 9728296
- Website: www.cecildaily.com

The Cecil Whig (the Whig) is a local newspaper that covers Cecil County, Maryland daily online and publishes two days a week. The Cecil Whig is one of the country's oldest newspapers. It is the oldest newspaper on Maryland's Eastern Shore still publishing under its original name. As of January 2025, Erik Halberg is the editor of the Cecil Whig, taking over for Executive Editor Jonathan Carter in November 2021.

== History ==
The paper was founded on Aug. 7, 1841 in Elkton, by Palmer Chamberlain Ricketts (father of Palmer C. Ricketts, who would later become president of Rensselaer Polytechnic Institute in 1901) to circulate the Whig political party beliefs in the wake of William Henry Harrison's presidential victory. The Cecil Whig promoted itself as “Devoted to Politics, Agriculture, The Useful Arts, Literature and General Intelligence.” It was originally published weekly, from Ricketts' log cabin near the intersection of Main and Bow streets in Elkton. In 1989, the Cecil Whig began daily circulation, publishing papers Monday through Friday. In 2012, the Cecil Whig began publishing three days a week on Mondays, Wednesdays and Fridays.

In 1843, Ricketts was indicted for murdering the editor of the rival paper Cecil Democrat, Amor T. Forwood, in Elkton. The murder was said to be incited by a personal political controversy between the two men which began in the pages of their respective newspapers. From his jail cell, Ricketts published the newspaper while awaiting trial. A jury later ruled that Ricketts' act had been in self-defense because his rival wielded a cane. In the September 2, 1843 issue, Ricketts writes, "He made an attack upon us at the post office, about noon. Impelled by that principle--the law of self-defence [sic], implanted by Nature in all her creatures, we shot and struck him." Two months later, in the November 4, 1843 issue, he announces the end of his trial: "The agony is over--the ordeal is passed--we are once more in our office in the enjoyment of liberty, and ready again to serve our subscribers to the best of our ability." Though he was acquitted of the murder, and though Forwood supposedly forgave Ricketts on his deathbed, the scandal and its subsequent blow to his reputation would last until his death in 1860.

By the 1850s, the Whigs had collapsed as a political party, and the Cecil Whig assumed the stance of the Know-Nothing Party. During this period, Maryland's Eastern Shore was a hotspot for Know-Nothing supporters.

In 1861, after Ricketts' death, the Cecil Whig was purchased by Edwin Evans Ewing, who had previously published several letters to the Whig about his experiences traveling to what was then the frontier country of Texas. Under Ewing, the paper became a strong pro-Unionist voice, proudly proclaiming, "Union is life, and Secession is death." He also erected a new building to house the paper on the corner of North Street and Whig Street to accommodate more offices and visitors. These offices were only utilized for two years, however; on Oct. 30, 1868 a fire destroyed the building. For several years, Ewing wrote editorials lambasting the efforts of local fire companies to save his building, complaining, "Had a ladder of sufficient length been procurable, [we] all agree that the fire could have been easily extinguished; but our Town Commissioners have provided neither ladder, hooks nor axes for such emergencies. [...] The hose, in this case, were eaten up by rats, which shows how much attention is paid the engines." He replaced the offices with a brick building that now serves as a Cecil Bank, at the corner of North and Whig streets. By June 1874, Ewing had built a new plant near his brick offices in Elkton. That brick office and plant would last for almost a century, escaping a second fire in 1948.

Ewing remained editor of the Cecil Whig until 1876, when he sold it to local Republican politician Henry R. Torbert in and moved to Topeka, Kansas. Under Torbert, the paper focused increasingly on local issues such as the railroad lines. In 1894, Henry's son Victor joined the masthead as co-editor and publisher. The Torberts sold the Whig in 1906 to Frank E. Williams, who was succeeded by co-editors Edward Johnson and Robert T. Thachery in 1921.

When E. Ralph Hostetter acquired the Whig in 1947, he transformed it into a regional newspaper conglomerate called the Chesapeake Publishing Corporation that owned 16 Maryland and Delaware newspapers. In September 1960, the Cecil Whig moved into its current location in Elkton at 601 N. Bridge St. in one of the country's first photo-offset printing plants. In April 2014, Quantum Controls, Inc., an electrical contracting company, negotiated the purchase of the Whig's former printing plant in Elkton for $575,000, according to Maryland Department of Assessments and Taxation records. The newspaper continues to lease back the front office portion of the building for the newspaper's operation. Printing of the publication moved to the regional Easton plant in the spring of 2010 during the downturn of the economy. The publication has spanned seven different buildings, 14 different publishers and multiple executive editors.

In 2014, Adams Publishing Group acquired 34 papers, including the Cecil Whig, from previous owner ACM.
