= Buck McGovern =

Charles C. McGovern
- Buck McGovern, c. 1930–1940
- Born: March 6, 1873; Downtown Pittsburgh area
- Died: August 29, 1962 (aged 89)
- Occupations: Law enforcement officer; soldier; politician
- Known for: Recapture of the Biddle brothers

Charles "Buck" McGovern (March 6, 1873 – August 29, 1962) was a Pennsylvania law enforcement officer, soldier, and politician best known for his role in the 1902 recapture of the condemned Biddle brothers after their escape from prison. An obituary called him a "rambunctious warhorse of the Republican Party in Pittsburgh [whose] 50-year career had carried him to far continents and through a thousand-and-one battles as a politician, Rough Rider, two-gun policeman and detective."

The Biddle Brothers episode served as a springboard for McGovern's later political career. He served in a private capacity to Theodore Roosevelt during the presidential campaign of 1912. After serving in the cavalry during World War I, patrolling the border and participating in the Battle of Ciudad Juarez, McGovern was chosen as the Chief of the Pittsburgh City Detective Bureau in 1922. He resigned this position soon after in order to help with the election campaign of Governor Gifford Pinchot. The next year he was chosen as a State Department of Justice special agent, and from 1927-1935 he served as an Allegheny County Commissioner. An avid historian, McGovern also hosted a longstanding weekly radio program on WJAS Pittsburgh throughout the 1930s and 1940s.

McGovern died on August 29, 1962, and was buried in Calvary Catholic Cemetery in Pittsburgh.
