= Calvary Catholic Cemetery (Pittsburgh) =

Cemetery in Pennsylvania, United States

Coordinates: 40.415°N 79.930°W

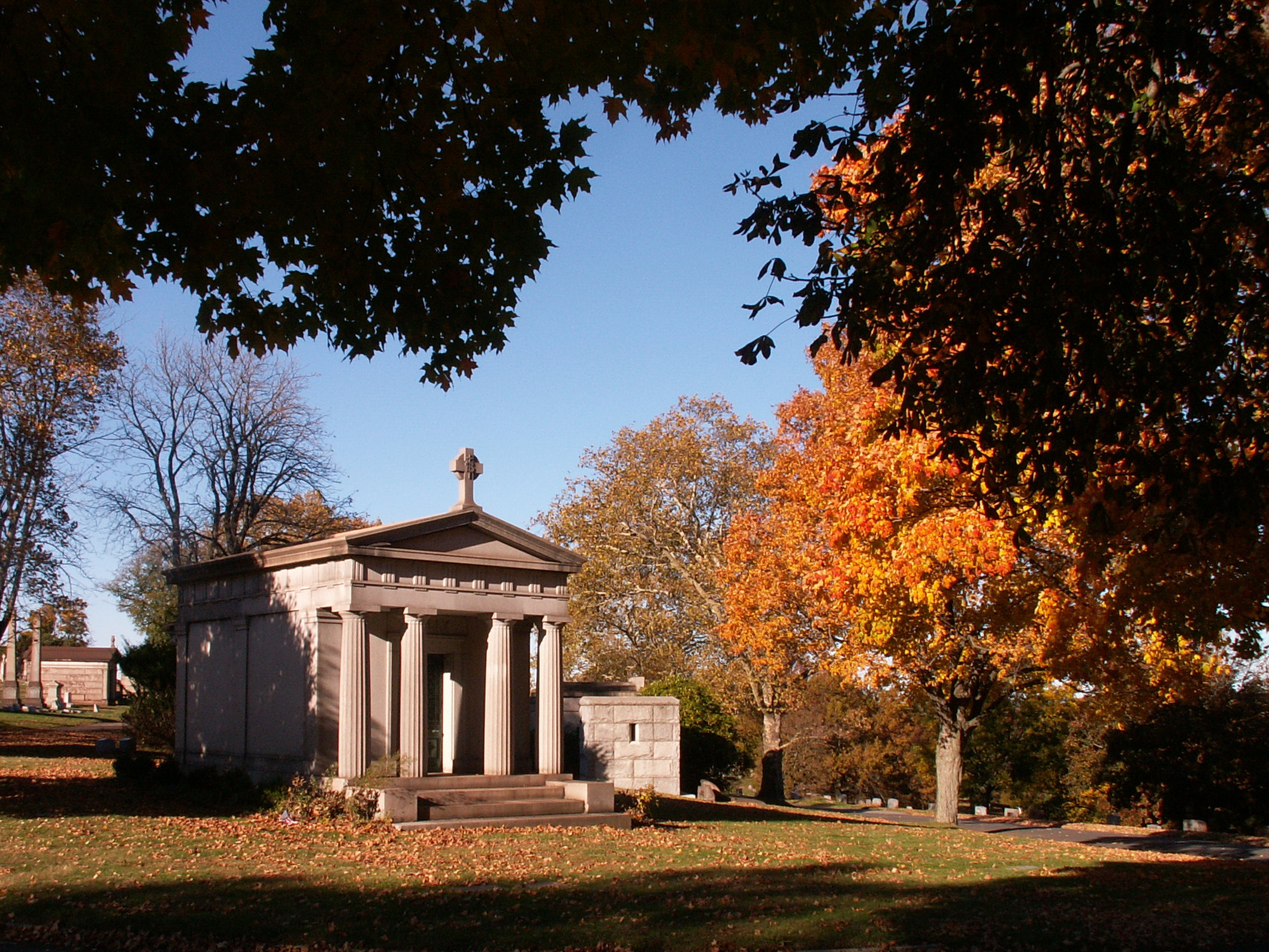
Mausoleums in Calvary Cemetery in the fall

Calvary Catholic Cemetery is located at 718 Hazelwood Avenue in the Greenfield and Hazelwood neighborhoods of Pittsburgh, Pennsylvania, United States.

It was founded in 1886 with the purchase of a 200-acre (80-hectare) tract. The first official interment occurred in 1888, though there are graves with earlier dates. As of 2008, 152,238 entombments have been recorded at Calvary Cemetery. It remains the largest of the cemeteries in the Roman Catholic Diocese of Pittsburgh.

== Notable burials ==
Actors/actresses

- Gerald Anthony, actor
- Frank Gorshin, actor, best known for his portrayal of The Riddler on Batman
- Gene Lyons (1921–1974), actor

Politicians

- James Francis Burke (U.S. Representative)
- William Joseph Burke (Pennsylvania Senator)
- Richard Caliguiri (Mayor of Pittsburgh (1978–88) )
- William J. Coyne (U.S. Representative)
- Thomas Gallagher (Transaction Mayor of Pittsburgh (1959))
- David Leo Lawrence (Mayor of Pittsburgh (1946–59), Governor of Pennsylvania (1959–63))
- James McDevitt Magee (U.S. Representative)
- Joseph A. McArdle (U.S. Representative)
- Buck McGovern (Allegheny County Commissioner, and famous for nabbing and tracking down Biddle Boys and Mrs Soffel in 1902)
- John Mary Morin (U.S. Representative)
- Michael Joseph Muldowney (U.S. Representative)
- Bob O'Connor (Mayor of Pittsburgh (2006) )
- Patrick J. Sullivan (Pennsylvania politician) (U.S. Representative)
- Gregory Zatkovich (lawyer and Rusyn political activist)

Religious figures

- Father James Cox (pro-labor priest and candidate for President of the United States)
- Vincent Leonard (9th Roman Catholic Bishop of Pittsburgh)

Sports

- Jack Butler (Professional football player, Pittsburgh Steelers, Pro Football Hall of Hame)
- Billy Conn (World Light Heavy-Weight Boxing Champion)
- Herbert Drury (Professional Hockey Player)
- Pud Galvin (Professional baseball player, Hall Of Fame)
- Harry Greb (World Middle-Weight Boxing Champion)
- Enos Kirkpatrick (Professional baseball player, MLB)
- Bill Regan (Professional baseball player, MLB Red Sox, catcher)
- Jimmy Smith (baseball player) (Professional baseball player, 8 seasons MLB)
- Moose Solters (Professional baseball player, outfield)
- Harry Stuhldreher (Notre Dame, All-Americans, one of the Four Horsemen (college football))
- Bucky Williams (Negro league baseball player, Pittsburgh Crawfords)
- James F Ruane Jr. (Professional Baseball Player - Philadelphia Phillies, Pittsburgh Pirates Bat Boy)

Various

- Jack and Ed Biddle (outlaws of "The Biddle Boys and Mrs Soffel" fame in 1902)
- Patricia Dobler (poet)
- Norman Frauenheim (American pianist)
- Mary Lou Williams (jazz pianist)
- John Kane (American painter)

The cemetery contains one British Commonwealth war grave of a Canadian soldier of World War I.
