= Another Kind of Monday =

1996 book by William E. Coles, Jr.

- First edition
- Author: William E. Coles, Jr.
- Language: English
- Publisher: Atheneum Books
- Publication date: 1996
- Publication place: United States
- Media type: Print (hardback)
- Pages: 234 pp
- ISBN: 978-0-689-80254-6
- OCLC: 33014053
- LC Class: PZ7.C67746 An 1996
- Followed by: Compass in the Blood

Another Kind of Monday is a 1996 young-adult novel by the American writer William E. Coles, Jr. (1932–2005) set in 1990s Pittsburgh, Pennsylvania.

It tells the story of Mark, a high school senior who by chance opens an old library copy of Great Expectations and finds $300 along with a set of directions that launches him into a scavenger hunt all over the city and unwittingly into a romance with a co-quester. As the two retrieve more and more assignments, their lives take twists and turns that bond them closer together.

The novel was recognized as an American Library Association Best Books for Young Adults in 1996.
