= Frank E. Williams =

American politician (1865–1920)

Member of the Maryland Senate from the Cecil County district
- In office 1914–1918
- Preceded by: Omar D. Crothers
- Succeeded by: Omar D. Crothers

Personal details
- Born: November 30, 1865 Ridgely, Maryland, U.S.
- Died: December 4, 1920 (aged 55) Elkton, Maryland, U.S.
- Resting place: Bethel Cemetery
- Party: Republican
- Spouse: Mary Wallace
- Children: 6, including Wallace
- Education: Conference Academy; Wesleyan College
- Alma mater: Princeton Theological Seminary
- Occupation: Politician; minister; newspaper editor and manager

Frank E. Williams (November 30, 1865 – December 4, 1920) was an American politician, minister and newspaperman from Maryland. He served as a member of the Maryland Senate, representing Cecil County from 1914 to 1918. He worked as a pastor and became the editor and manager of the Cecil Whig.

== Early life ==
Frank E. Williams was born on November 30, 1865, in Ridgely, Caroline County, Maryland, to Emily Bell (née Thomas) and Thomas S. Williams. His father was a minister of the Methodist Episcopal Church. He was educated at Conference Academy in Dover, Delaware, and Wesleyan College. He graduated from Princeton Theological Seminary.

== Career ==
After graduating, Williams became an assistant pastor of a Presbyterian Church in Washington, D.C. He then worked as a pastor of Northminster Presbyterian Church in Baltimore for 12 years. Due to ill health, he resigned. He then worked as pastor of a Presbyterian church in Lewes, Delaware, for two years.

In 1906, Williams gave up the ministry and bought a farm in Elkton, Maryland. He purchased larger farms and became a landowner in Cecil County. He purchased the Cecil Whig and founded the Cecil Whig Publishing Company. He replaced Henry R. Torbert as editor. He worked as editor and manager of the paper until his death.

Williams was a Republican. He was a member of the Maryland Senate, representing Cecil County, from 1914 to 1918.

== Personal life ==
Williams married Mary Wallace, daughter of Joseph V. Wallace. They had four sons and two daughters, Wallace, Frank, Fletcher P., Joseph, Emily and Cornelia. His son Wallace was a state senator.

Williams died on December 4, 1920, following an operation at Union Hospital in Elkton. He was buried at Bethel Cemetery.
