= Allegheny County Courthouse =

Courthouse and jail complex in Pittsburgh, Pennsylvania, U.S.

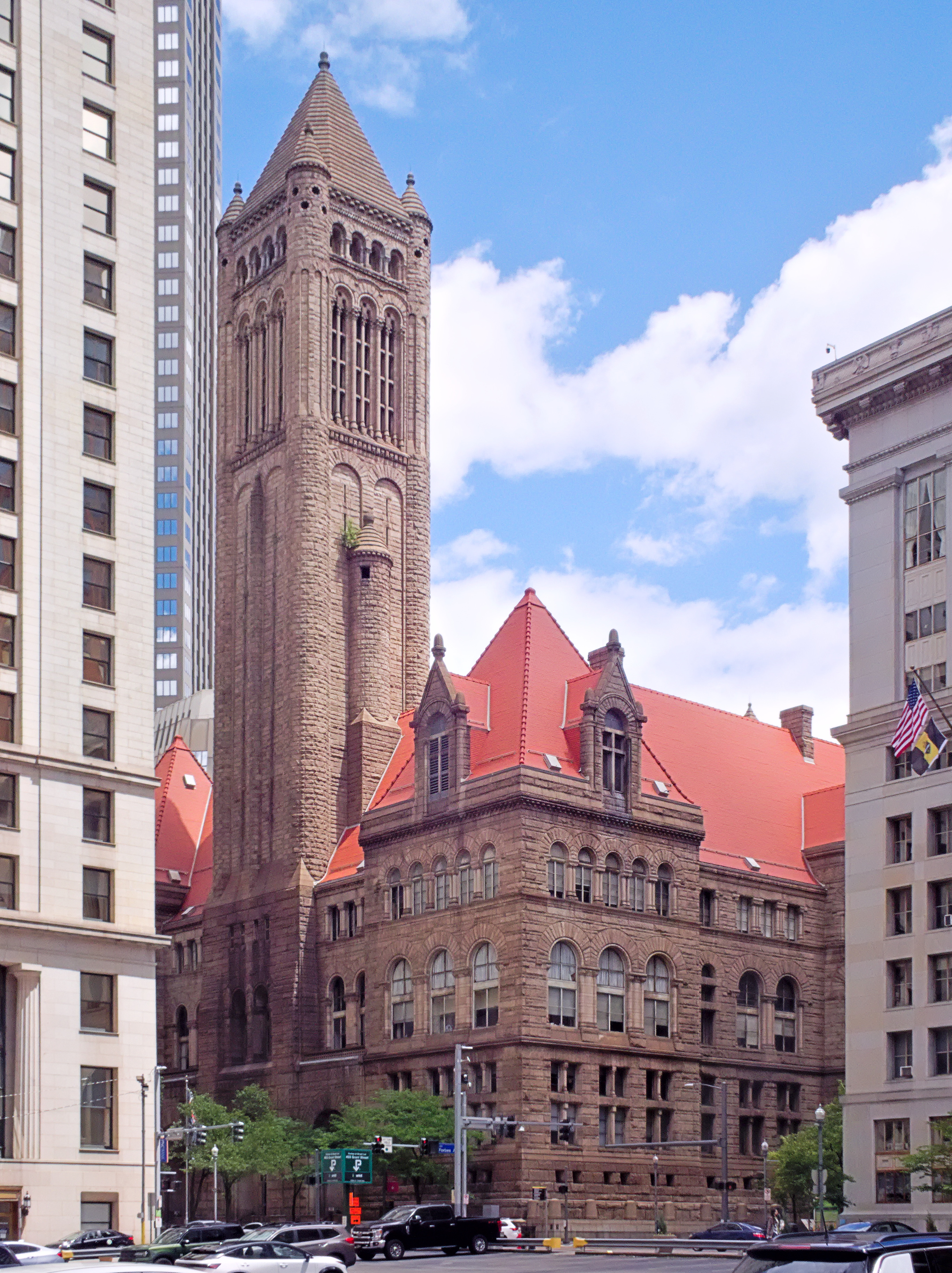
- In May 2025
- Interactive map of the Allegheny County Courthouse area

General information
- Type: Court house
- Location: 436 Grant Street; Pittsburgh, Pennsylvania, U.S.
- Coordinates: 40°26′18″N 79°59′46″W
- Construction started: 1883
- Completed: 1888
- Owner: Allegheny County
- Operator: Allegheny County Department of Public Works

Height
- Antenna spire: 76.2 m (250 ft)
- Roof: 30.48 m (100.0 ft)

Technical details
- Floor count: 5

Design and construction
- Architect: Henry Hobson Richardson
- Allegheny County Courthouse and Jail
- U.S. National Register of Historic Places
- U.S. National Historic Landmark
- City of Pittsburgh Historic Structure
- Pittsburgh Landmark – PHLF
- Architectural style: Romanesque
- NRHP reference No.: 73001586

Significant dates
- Added to NRHP: March 7, 1973
- Designated NHL: May 11, 1976
- Designated CPHS: December 26, 1972
- Designated PHLF: 1968

The Allegheny County Courthouse in Downtown Pittsburgh, is part of a complex (along with the old Allegheny County Jail) designed by H. H. Richardson. The buildings are considered among the finest examples of the Romanesque Revival style for which Richardson is well known.

The complex is bordered by wide thoroughfares named for city founders James Ross (Ross Street), John Forbes (Forbes Avenue) and James Grant (Grant Street). The current building, completed in 1888, was designated a National Historic Landmark in 1976. Richardson later referred to it as his "great achievement".

== Early structures ==
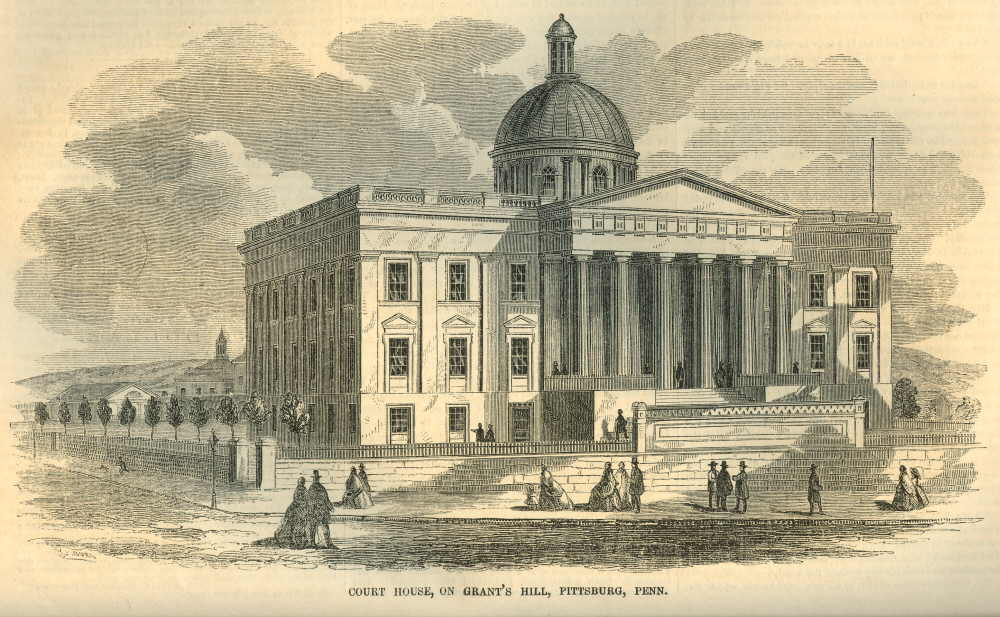
Second Courthouse, Pittsburgh, in 1857. This courthouse was ruined by fire in 1882

Pittsburgh's original courthouse, first occupied in 1794, was a wooden structure located on one side of Market Square. The Pennsylvania Supreme Court and from December 7, 1818, until 1841 the Western District of Pennsylvania also held court sessions at Market Square.

Land for a new courthouse was purchased in April 1834. This was a tract of land on the corner of Forbes Avenue and Grant Street, on Grant's Hill. Construction took place between 1836 and 1840. This court house was built with polished gray sandstone, quarried at Coal Hill (present-day Mount Washington), opposite Water Street along the Monongahela River. The building was designed by John Chislett. The Greek Revival design included a domed cupola housing a rotunda 60 feet (18 m) in diameter and 80 feet (24 m) high. The building was completed in 1841. The building's second floor again served as the headquarters for both the Commonwealth Supreme Court Pittsburgh region and the Federal Western District, serving the latter until a new U.S. Customs House/Post Office opened on Fifth and Smithfield in 1853. Due to corrosion caused by coal smoke, the building deteriorated: the dressed surface of the facade dropped off, some of the cornices near the roof began to fall, and the building had a scaly appearance. On May 7, 1882, a fire broke out and destroyed the building. Subsequently, it was demolished. The third, and present, courthouse was erected on the same spot.

== Current structure ==
Following the destruction of the second courthouse, Allegheny County Commissioners decided to hold a competition to design a replacement. The winner of the competition was Boston architect Henry Hobson Richardson and construction of the buildings was begun by the Norcross Brothers, Richardson's construction firm of choice, in 1884. The cornerstone for the building was laid on October 13, 1884.

The design of the main building, which Richardson considered to be his finest, was innovative in that the building is built around an interior courtyard, thus allowing natural light and fresh air to reach most of the building. The courtyard is surrounded by four stories in three sides. A tower rises five stories from the courtyard's open side. As was usually the case with Richardson's buildings, the roof is steep with dormers placed at all the corners. The building's roof is covered with Ludowici clay tiles.

A prison is connected to the courthouse via the "Bridge of Sighs". The design was based on the Bridge of Sighs in Venice. The entire complex was built of large rusticated blocks of granite, with the entrance ways and windows topped with wide arches. This gives the building a heavy, stable and dignified appearance.

In the 1900s the street level in front of the building was lowered as part of a general re-grading of Pittsburgh. Richardson had anticipated this and courses of finished masonry had been buried underground, now to be revealed. This left the ceremonial entrance a full story above the street. A grand stairway was built, but removed during street widening in the 1930s- the low arched doorways were extended downwards to street level, with the result that the visitor is not greeted by the grand entrance hall Richardson planned, but by the low corridors which were once the basement.

Muralist Vincent Nesbert completed five murals for the building on its first floor in 1937: "Industry", "Justice", "Peace", "Fort Duquesne" and "The Battle of Grant's Hill."

In 1973, the building was placed on the National Register of Historic Places. In 1976, it was designated a National Historic Landmark.

A new jail was built by Allegheny County in 1995 near the Allegheny River. The old jail underwent a transformation to become the Family Division of the Allegheny County Court of Common Pleas. The conversion, which cost approximately $25 million and took two years to complete, aimed to retain key elements of the jail like the rotunda, the cell blocks, and the warden's office. A part of the old cell block is now home to the Old Allegheny County Jail Museum, exhibiting jail history and artifacts.

The restoration work involved asbestos removal, new plumbing and electrical systems installation, air conditioning addition, and new offices and courtrooms creation. It also encompassed the preservation of the historic elements like the stone facade, the ironwork, and the stained glass windows. The conversion project earned multiple awards for adaptive reuse and historic preservation, including the National Trust for Historic Preservation Honor Award in 2002 and the American Institute of Architects Pittsburgh Chapter Award in 2001.

== Legacy and impact ==
The design of the Allegheny County Courthouse has influenced buildings in many cities across North America, such as Toronto City Hall, Minneapolis City Hall, the Milwaukee Federal Building, Altgeld Hall on the campus of the University of Illinois at Urbana–Champaign and James W. McLaughlin's Wayne County Courthouse in Richmond, Indiana.

In 2007, the American Institute of Architects asked Harris Interactive to survey 2,000 people, who were shown 247 photographs of buildings and other structures in different categories chosen by 2,500 architects. The Allegheny County Courthouse was ranked 35th overall on the list and above every other courthouse in the nation except the United States Supreme Court Building.

== In popular culture ==
Several big-budget films have portrayed the Courthouse. Striking Distance and Hoffa primarily used interior shots, while Desperate Measures and The Next Three Days used both interior and exterior shots, with Boys on the Side and Mrs. Soffel featuring the Ross Street side of the complex and the "Bridge of Sighs".

== Gallery ==
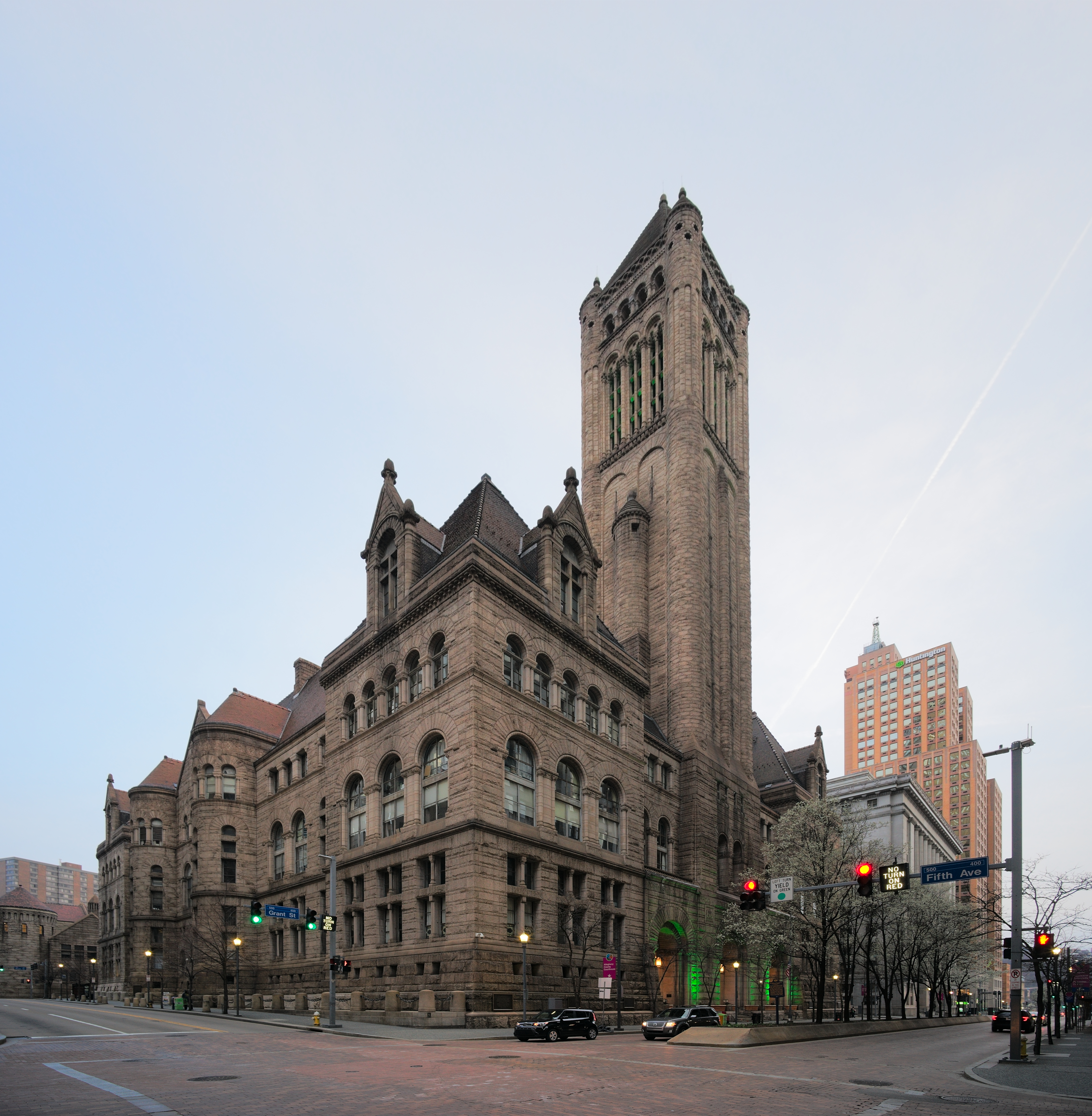
View from street

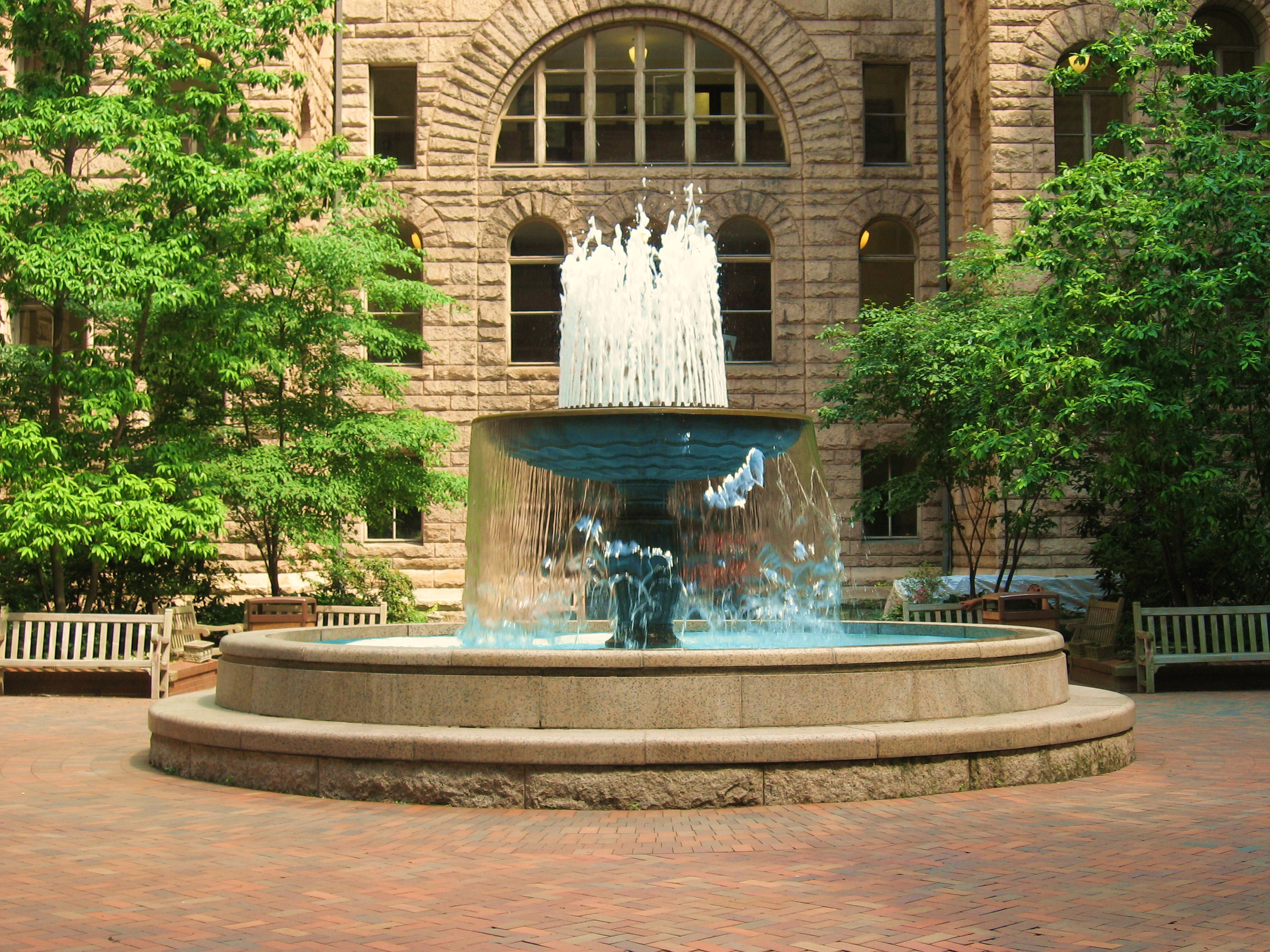
Fountain in the Courtyard

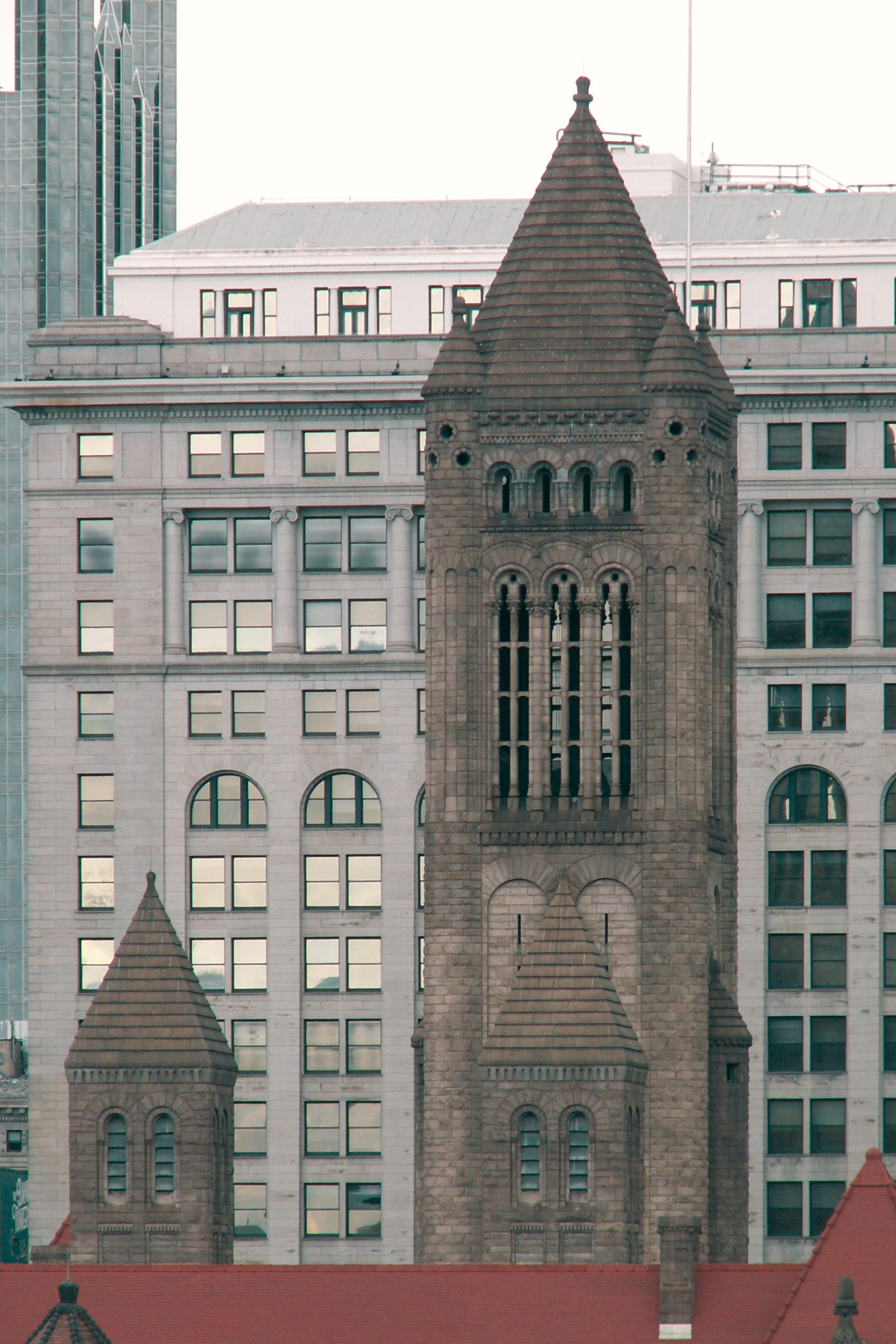
Towers

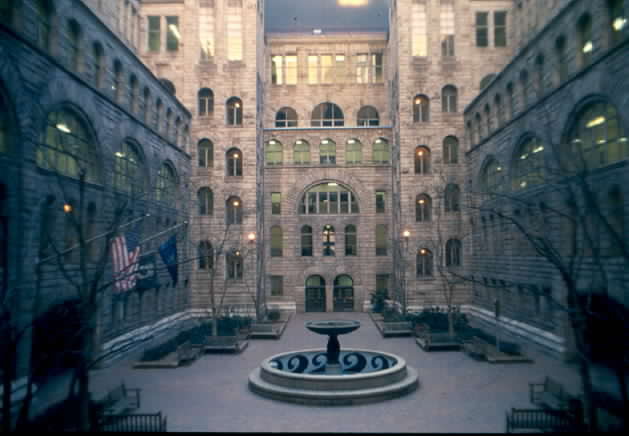
Interior courtyard

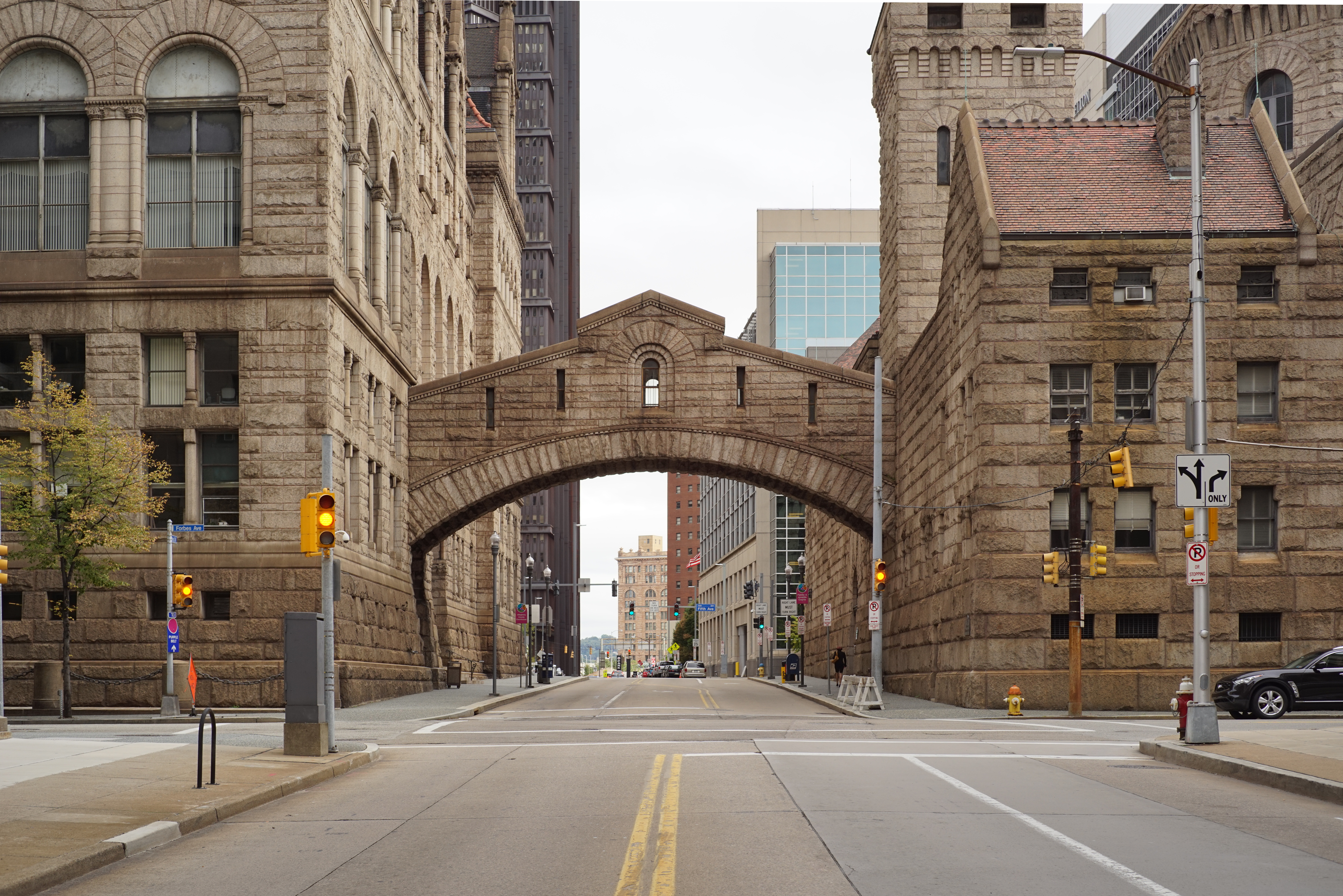
Bridge of Sighs

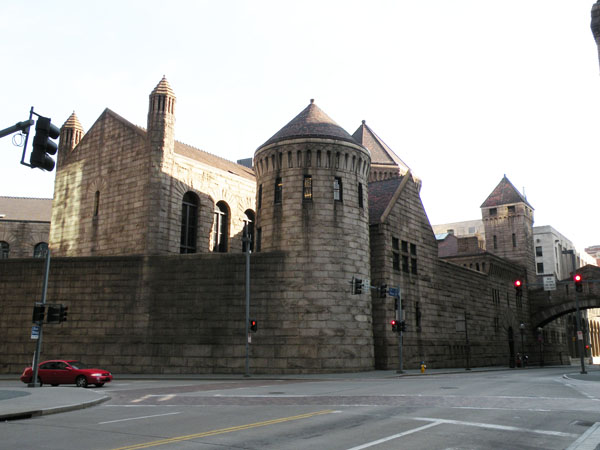
The former Allegheny County Jail

== See also ==
- List of state and county courthouses in Pennsylvania
