= Mrs. Soffel =

1984 film by Gillian Armstrong

- Promotional movie poster for the film
- Directed by: Gillian Armstrong
- Written by: Ron Nyswaner
- Produced by: Edgar J. Scherick; David A. Nicksay; Scott Rudin
- Starring: Diane Keaton; Mel Gibson; Matthew Modine; Edward Herrmann
- Cinematography: Russell Boyd
- Edited by: Nicholas Beauman
- Music by: Mark Isham
- Production company: Metro-Goldwyn-Mayer
- Distributed by: MGM/UA Entertainment Company
- Release date: December 26, 1984
- Running time: 112 minutes
- Country: United States
- Language: English
- Budget: $11 million
- Box office: $4,385,312

Mrs. Soffel is a 1984 American drama film directed by Gillian Armstrong, starring Diane Keaton and Mel Gibson and based on the story of condemned brothers Jack and Ed Biddle, who escaped prison with the aid of Kate Soffel, the warden's wife.

It was filmed on location in and around the Serez family farm in Mulmur, Ontario, as well as Wisconsin (train sequences) and establishing shots in Pittsburgh. The jail sequences were filmed in both the Allegheny County Courthouse and inside and outside of the old Allegheny County Jail for three days, and prisoners there were used as extras in the movie. The film was entered in the 35th Berlin International Film Festival.

== Plot ==
Kate Soffel is married to a Pittsburgh prison warden in 1901. They have four children. After several months of being sick in bed for no discernible reason, she suddenly regains her strength. She visits inmates to read Bible scripture to them and meets Ed Biddle and his brother Jack, robbers who were sentenced to death for the murder of a robbery victim. Kate is immediately fascinated with Ed and the attraction seems to be mutual. Ed insists that he and Jack did not commit the murder they were convicted for, that it was, rather, an accomplice of theirs.

Kate visits both brothers repeatedly and reads scripture to them. One time, Ed reads her a poem he wrote for her and they kiss, giving Kate a crisis of conscience. She stops her daily visits. One night several days later, she notices a fire in the cell block and alerts the guards, who extract Ed from his burning cell. He had earlier mentioned to Jack his intention to spring them both from prison by instigating a fire in his cell, but does not try an escape. Instead he tells Kate that he had thought she had abandoned them. He later writes her a note asking her to help their escape by providing hacksaw blades for their cell door bars, which she does.

When the time of the escape attempt arrives around Christmas time, Kate sends her children away. During the night, Ed and Jack leave their cells and overpower the only two guards on duty, stealing a gun. They break into the warden's home and surprise Kate, taking her with them.

When the three temporarily take shelter with the family of Jessie, presumably Ed's girlfriend, Jessie insists they abandon Kate, because she will only slow them down, but Ed takes her with him and Jack. They freighthop to Perrysville, where they steal a horse-drawn sled and try to go north, hoping to eventually reach Canada. Meanwhile, detective McGovern, who had captured the Biddle brothers originally, organizes a posse and sets out in pursuit.

During a stop at an abandoned factory, Ed surprises a man who had noticed them in Perrysville and had followed them for the bounty of $5000 which had been posted as reward for their capture. The man tells Ed that he had informed the Pittsburgh police. Detective McGovern had also been informed. Ed knocks out the man and takes his rifle, but does not tell the others that the police have their trail.

When the three stop at the farm of an elderly couple to buy some food, they are cordially invited to stay. The couple mentions that they do not read the news and the three accept the invitation. In their room Ed and Kate make love. Afterwards, Ed seems to admit to the murder but insists that Jack is innocent. Kate says she forgives him.

The next day, the three are discovered at the farm and flee in their sled with the posse in pursuit. During the following shootout, both brothers are shot. Kate tearfully asks Ed to kill her so she will not get caught and he, equally tearfully, shoots her. Both brothers flee on foot but are shot again multiple times and are surrounded. Ed asks McGovern to kill him, but he is stopped by another member of the posse. The fate of the brothers was unknown.

Another member of the posse finds Kate, still alive, in the sled and she is sent to the hospital, where she is visited by her eldest daughter. Later, Kate is sent to the same Pittsburgh prison, where she is seen cradling the poem that Ed had written her and that a friend had helped her smuggle into the cell.

== Cast ==
- Diane Keaton as Kate Soffel
- Mel Gibson as Ed Biddle
- Matthew Modine as Jack Biddle
- Edward Herrmann as Warden Peter Soffel
- Trini Alvarado as Irene Soffel
- Jennifer Dundas as Margaret Soffel
- Danny Corkill as Eddie Soffel
- Harley Cross as Clarence Soffel
- Terry O'Quinn as Detective Charles "Buck" McGovern
- Pippa Pearthree as Maggie
- William Youmans as Guard George Koslow
- Maury Chaykin as Guard Charlie Reynolds
- Joyce Ebert as Matron Agnes Garvey
- Wayne Robson as Halliday
- Dana Wheeler-Nicholson as Jessie Bodyne
- Les Rubie as Mr. Stevenson
- Paula Trueman as Mrs. Stevenson
- Katie McCombs as Rachel Garvey
- William Duell as Lenny
- Walter Massey as Mr. Robinson
- Heather Graham as factory girl (uncredited, debut film appearance)

== Reception ==
Pauline Kael wrote:

What's daring in the way Gillian Armstrong presents this love story is that we don't quite trust the emotions of either Kate Soffel or Ed Biddle. She's sickly, frustrated, unstable; he's an opportunist, with only one opportunity-- to make her love him so madly that she'll bring him and Jack the saws they need to get out...Mel Gibson...is superb here. Much wirier than in his earlier roles, he's convincingly passionate, shrewd, relentless...Diane Keaton has trouble with the period role...But she has a moment here that's freakishly inspired: Ed has been holding her against the bars and she's been speaking like a moral exemplar when suddenly, in mid-sentence, she lets out a dirty little giggle. We know then that Kate is living in a fever dream and doesn't want to wake up. And the post-hippie diction and the other surface flaws in Keaton's performance fade into relative insignificance, because the things that come from inside are so startlingly right...The movie builds an excitement that has something to do with the fact that the flight of the Biddles with Kate in tow is deranged. They're killing each other by staying together, but you can see that staying together is all that matters to them.

On Rotten Tomatoes, it has a 46% approval rating based on 13 reviews, with an average score of 5.1/10. Roger Ebert gave the film two stars, calling it "an anemic Bonnie and Clyde" and concluded that the performances were unconvincing. Vincent Canby called it a "very strange and maddening movie", but praised the performances of Keaton and Gibson.
