= William E. Coles Jr. =

American novelist

William E. Coles. Jr.
- Born: 1932; Summit, New Jersey
- Died: March 21, 2005 (aged 72–73)
- Occupation: Novelist

William E. Coles Jr. (1932–2005) was an American novelist and professor.

Born in Summit, New Jersey, Coles earned degrees from Lehigh University, the University of Connecticut, the University of Minnesota. From 1974 to 1998 he served as a professor and director of composition at the University of Pittsburgh. Previously he taught at Amherst College and at Case Western Reserve University. He was married to Janet Kafka. Coles died on March 21, 2005.

== Books ==
- The Plural I, English composition instruction book (Holt, Rinehart & Winston, 1978).
- Funnybone, novel (New York: Atheneum Books, 1992).
- Another Kind of Monday, novel (New York: Atheneum Books, 1996).
- Compass in the Blood, novel (New York: Atheneum Books, 2001).

== Sources ==
- Contemporary Authors Online. The Gale Group, 2006.
- Matthew Lavelle (2007). Pennsylvania Center for the Book: Profile of William E. Coles, Jr.. Retrieved November 29, 2008.
- Storlie, Erik F. Go Deep & Take Plenty of Root: A Prairie-Norwegian Father, Rebellion in Minneapolis, Basement Zen, Growing Up, Growing Tender. Recollections of W.E. Coles, Chapters 6–7. Createspace 2013.
