= Bucky Williams =

American baseball player (1906–2009)

- Born: December 15, 1906; Baltimore, Maryland, U.S.
- Died: November 16, 2009 (aged 102); Penn Hills, Pennsylvania, U.S.

Wallace Ignatious “Bucky” Williams (December 15, 1906 – November 16, 2009) was a Negro league baseball player and, at the time of his death, the second oldest living former Negro league player behind 104-year-old Emilio Navarro. Williams was a member for the Pittsburgh Crawfords from 1927 to 1932, the Akron Black Tyrites and Cleveland Giants in 1933, and Homestead Grays in 1936. He was known to play earlier with the Pittsburgh Monarchs.

He was born in Baltimore, Maryland, a son to Joseph and Mathilda Williams. At the age of six months he moved to Pittsburgh and was a member of St. Charles Lwanga Parish in Pittsburgh's East End. His wife, Marjorie, whom he married in 1936, died in 1976.

Williams worked after his Negro leagues playing days with the Edgar Thomson Steel Works of U.S. Steel in Braddock, Pennsylvania, where he played ball. He is an honorary member of the Negro League Hall of Fame. In 1995, he traveled to Kansas City for a gathering of Negro leagues players. To celebrate his 100th birthday a party was held December 16, 2006, at the Churchill Country Club that was attended by family, friends and local community members.

Williams died at age 102, on November 16, 2009. He is interred in Calvary Cemetery in the Pittsburgh's Hazelwood neighborhood.
