= Norman Frauenheim =

- Born: Norman A. Vilsack Frauenheim; October 29, 1897; Pittsburgh, Pennsylvania, U.S.
- Died: November 18, 1989 (aged 92)
- Occupations: Pianist, educator
- Instrument: Piano

Norman A. Vilsack Frauenheim, (October 29, 1897 – November 18, 1989), was an American pianist and music teacher. For many decades he was acclaimed for his performances in America and Europe. He is also remembered by his many students for imparting the style of his own famous teachers and for outstanding guidance with their repertoires.

== Family ==
Born in Pittsburgh, Pennsylvania, on October 29, 1897, Norman Frauenheim was the fifth of the seven children of Edward J. and Antoinette Marie “Nettie” Vilsack Frauenheim, whose parents were the co-founders of the Pittsburgh Brewing Company. Their families were prominent in early Pittsburgh society through their involvement in industry, banking and philanthropies.

== Musical training and career ==
Norman Frauenheim attended the prestigious Shady Side Academy in Pittsburgh and Fordham University. He served briefly in the United States Navy in World War I. He studied music in Paris in the 1920s and subsequently studied with Ignacy Jan Paderewski. He was also a student for many years of Zygmunt Stojowski.

Frauenheim made concert tours in France, Spain and Great Britain, including command performances for royalty. His American debut was in 1926 at Town Hall New York City. Across the next five years he performed often in several American cities.

Early in his career he was a soloist with the National Symphony Orchestra under the direction of Antonia Brica, the first American female conductor. He was a close friend of Guiomar Novaes, the famous Brazilian pianist who also studied under Stojowski. From the decade of the late 1920s to late 1930s he lived and performed in New York City and Pittsburgh. He performed at Carnegie Hall in 1946.

About 1940 Frauenheim moved to Washington, D.C., where he continued to perform until 1960. Washington newspapers reviewed his performances at the Phillips Collection Gallery, the Sulgrave Club, Dumbarton Oaks, the Friends House in Georgetown and other halls. He gave a series of classical music lecture-recitals in Washington, D.C., on radio station WMAL of NBC. He repeated the series in many places.

Frauenheim taught privately in New York City and Pittsburgh and was a music professor (1926–1930) at the Carnegie Institute of Technology (now Carnegie Mellon University). He was a well known piano teacher in the Washington metropolitan area for four decades and continued to teach until the year before his death when he relocated to the Pittsburgh area. In 1955 he married Enid Mitchell, reported to friends and relatives to be an English countess. They had no children. Unfortunately she died early in the marriage. He died at age 92 in Pittsburgh and was buried in the Roman Catholic Calvary Cemetery.

In 2005 several of his students began the process of forming a Norman Frauenheim Students’ Society. A major activity has been a compilation of Paderewski’s techniques and personal editing as taught by Frauenheim. The recounting of his experiences with famous musicians, important persons and fascinating places and events has been valued by the students, and Frauenheim's friends and family. His collection of photographs, many with personal inscriptions, and other memorabilia completed these important histories.

Frauenheim is included in the Ampico Player Piano Roll Catalog. He recorded Schubert’s Impromptu Op. 142, #2 in Ab in August 1930, catalogue #7070(3).

== Death and interment ==
Frauenheim died in Pittsburgh on November 18, 1989, and was buried at that city's Cavalry Cemetery.
