= Allegheny County Jail =

Jail in Pittsburgh, Pennsylvania, United States

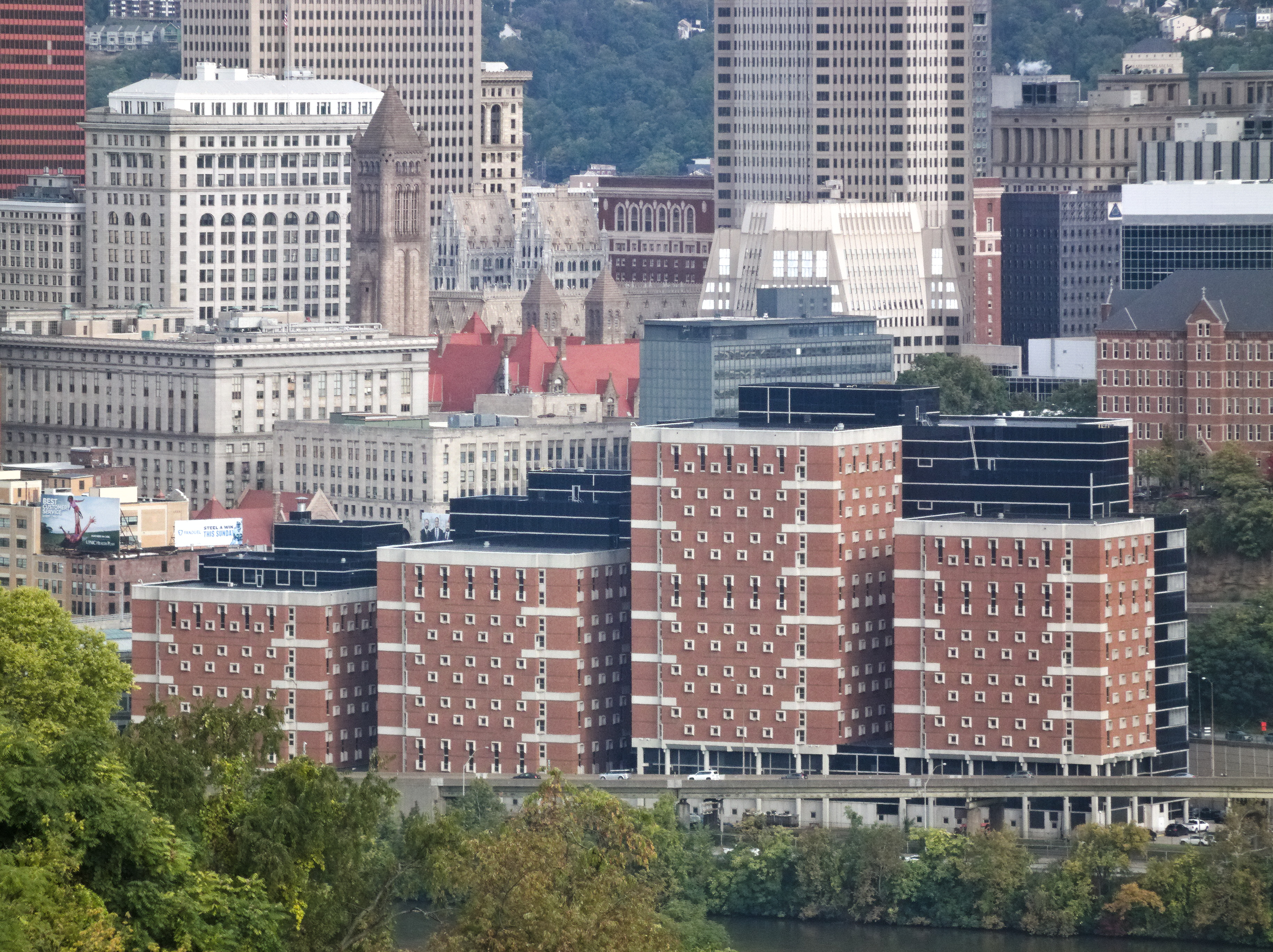
- The current Allegheny County Jail

General information
- Location: 950 Second Avenue, Downtown, Pittsburgh, Pennsylvania, USA
- Coordinates: 40°26′05″N 79°59′37″W
- Year built: 1992–1995
- Opened: April 29, 1995

Design and construction
- Architect: Tasso Katselas

Old Allegheny County Jail
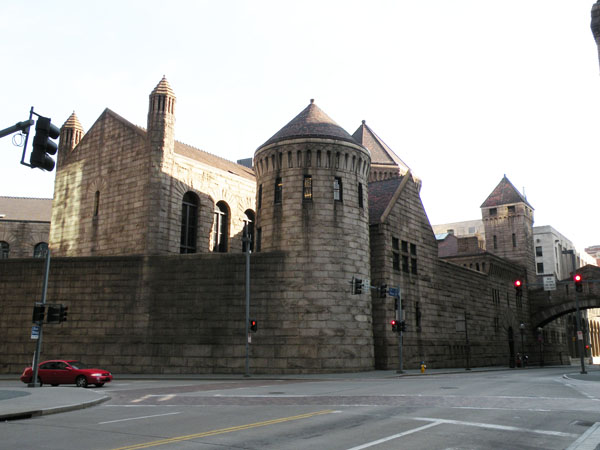
- The old Allegheny County Jail

- Location within Pittsburgh
- 40°26′19″N 79°59′44″W
- Location: Ross Street and Fifth Avenue (Downtown), Pittsburgh, Pennsylvania, USA

History
- Built: 1886

Site notes
- Architect: H. H. Richardson

The Allegheny County Jail is the municipal jail of Allegheny County, located at 950 Second Avenue in Pittsburgh, Pennsylvania. The current facility, completed in 1995, replaced the old jail, which is attached to the Allegheny County Courthouse and now serves court functions.

== History ==
=== Old jail ===
The old Allegheny County Jail was part of a complex (along with the Allegheny County Courthouse) designed by H. H. Richardson. The buildings are considered among the finest examples of the Romanesque Revival style for which Richardson is well known.

The jail was built by the Norcross Brothers between 1884 and 1886 (the year of Richardson's death), and the courthouse was finished in 1888 under the supervision of Shepley, Rutan and Coolidge. The two structures are linked across Ross Street by a "Bridge of Sighs" (so called for its similarity to the famous bridge in Venice, Italy). Additions were made 1903–1905 by Frederick J. Osterling.

In 1892, anarchist Alexander Berkman was held here awaiting trial for the attempted murder of industrialist H. C. Frick. In 1902, condemned brothers Jack and Ed Biddle escaped from the jail with the aid of the warden's wife.

The jail and courthouse were added to the List of City of Pittsburgh historic designations on December 26, 1972. They were added to the List of National Historic Landmarks on May 11, 1976. After its 1995 closing, most of the building was renovated to become the Allegheny County family court, while a small section of a cell block has been preserved as a museum dedicated to the history of the jail.

=== New jail ===
Due to crowded and insecure conditions at the old jail, the current Allegheny County Jail opened on April 29, 1995, at a cost of $147 million, after 29 months of construction. The five- to eight-story building was designed by L. Robert Kimball & Associates and Tasso Katselas Associates, and won a citation from the joint committee of the American Institute of Architects and the American Correctional Association. It houses 1,800 cells, and although its original capacity was set at 1,850, the county puts its capacity at over 3,000. Its population varies from day to day, and mostly remains under 1,800. It is situated next to the campus of Duquesne University (Katselas intended for the waterfront view of the jail to complement and echo the university's Old Main), and sited on a 17-acre "peninsula" surrounded by highways on all sides.

According to a 1996 Pennsylvania Department of Corrections report, the jail lacked "formal leadership" already shortly after its opening. Controversy surrounding the jail has continued to the present, through the terms of several wardens. Particular concerns have been raised regarding new use-of-force training, unsanitary living conditions, the jail's death rate, insufficient mental and health care, and persistent disputes between jail administration and the correctional officer's union. In light of these concerns, the county is attempting to reduce the jail's population by methods including diversion to treatment programs and wider use of "alternative housing" outside of the jail.

In May 2023, a group of protestors rallied against the conditions at the Allegheny County Jail. The police reported an assembly of 50 to 60 people on the 400 block of Grant Street, Downtown, shortly before 2:30 PM. The protestors then marched down Fifth Avenue. According to a flyer, the gathering was sponsored by the Alliance for Police Accountability. The 2025 arrival of warden Trevor Wingard, who promised to shake up the jail's "status quo", was met with cautious approval from the Alliance.

== Jail Oversight Board ==
The Jail Oversight Board of Allegheny County is a statutory body that oversees the operation and maintenance of the Allegheny County Jail and its alternative housing facilities. The board's responsibilities also include overseeing the health and safekeeping of its incarcerated residents, and the confirmation of the County Executive's selection of a warden.

The board is composed of nine members, including elected officials, judges, and citizen members. These members are:

- The County Chief Executive
- Two judges of the Court of Common Pleas
- The County Sheriff
- The County Controller
- The President of County Council
- Three citizen members.

Meetings are held at least once per month, usually on the first Thursday, in the Gold Room of the Allegheny County Courthouse. These meetings are open to the public and are streamed live on YouTube. The public can submit comments or questions online prior to the meetings or sign up for public comment before each meeting.

In addition to regular meetings, the board receives monthly reports on various aspects of the jail's operations, such as segregated housing, use of force, deaths, grievances, and health care.

Community-based coalition the Corrections Collective provides resources and support for incarcerated individuals, their families, and communities affected by arrest and incarceration.

Public access to records and documents regarding the Board and Allegheny County Jail is provided by the Controller's Office. This includes meeting minutes, the warden's monthly reports, and other jail-related records.

== List of wardens ==
The following individuals have served as warden of the Allegheny County Jail since its opening:

- Leonard Dever (1995–2005)
- Calvin Lightfoot (2005–2007)
- Ramsey Elias (2007–2010)
- Daniel Onorato (interim, 2010)
- Ramon Rustin (2010–2014)
- Orlando Harper (2014–2023)
- Shane Dady (2023–2025)
- Trevor Wingard (2025–present)

== In popular culture ==
The 1984 film Mrs. Soffel, based on the escape of the Biddle brothers, includes shots of the jail exterior and then-interior scenes. Over the three days of filming at the jail, some prisoners were used as extras. The jail was featured in the 2010 film The Next Three Days.

The old Allegheny County Jail has been used in many other movies, including The Silence of the Lambs (film).

== Gallery ==
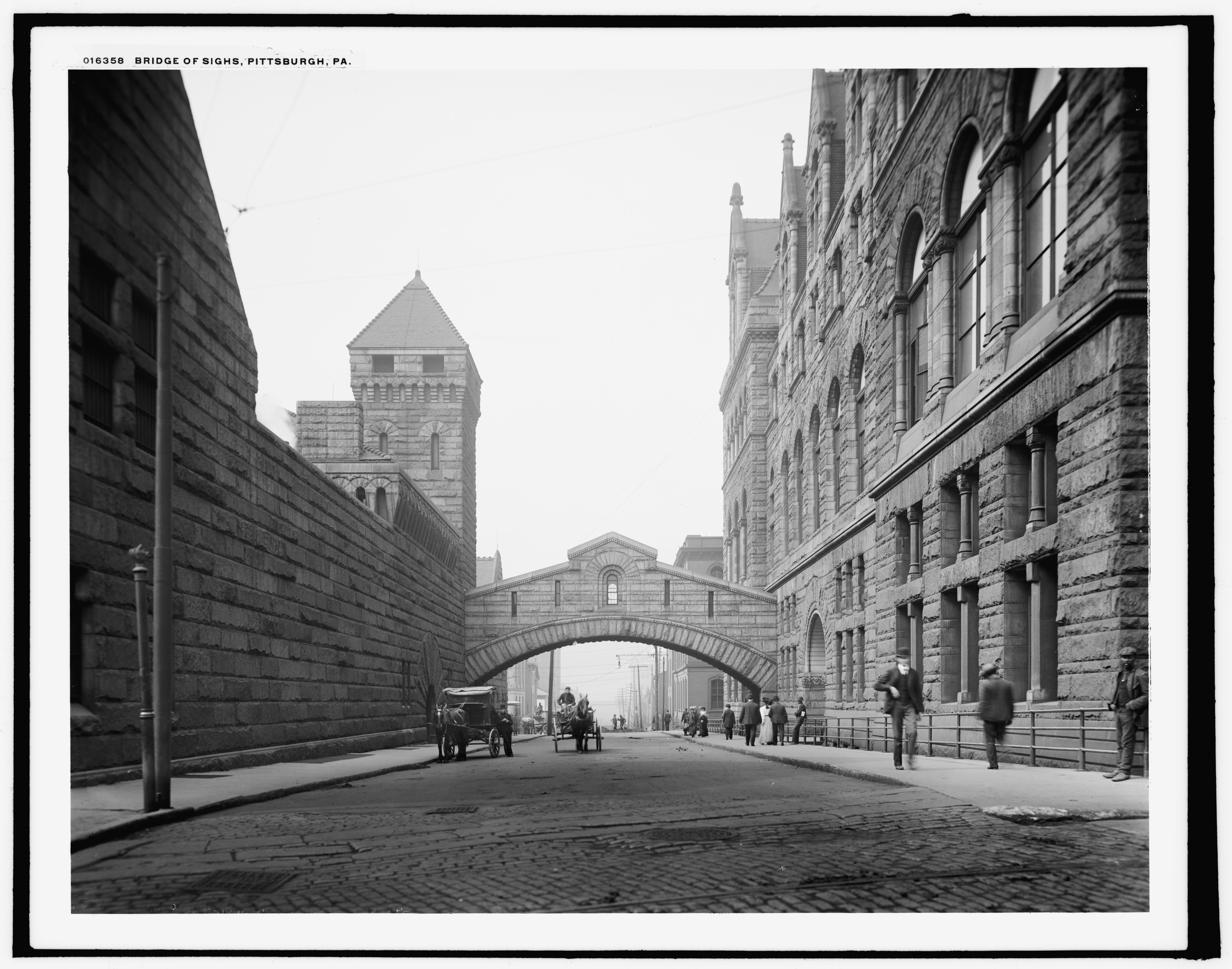
The old jail's "bridge of sighs"

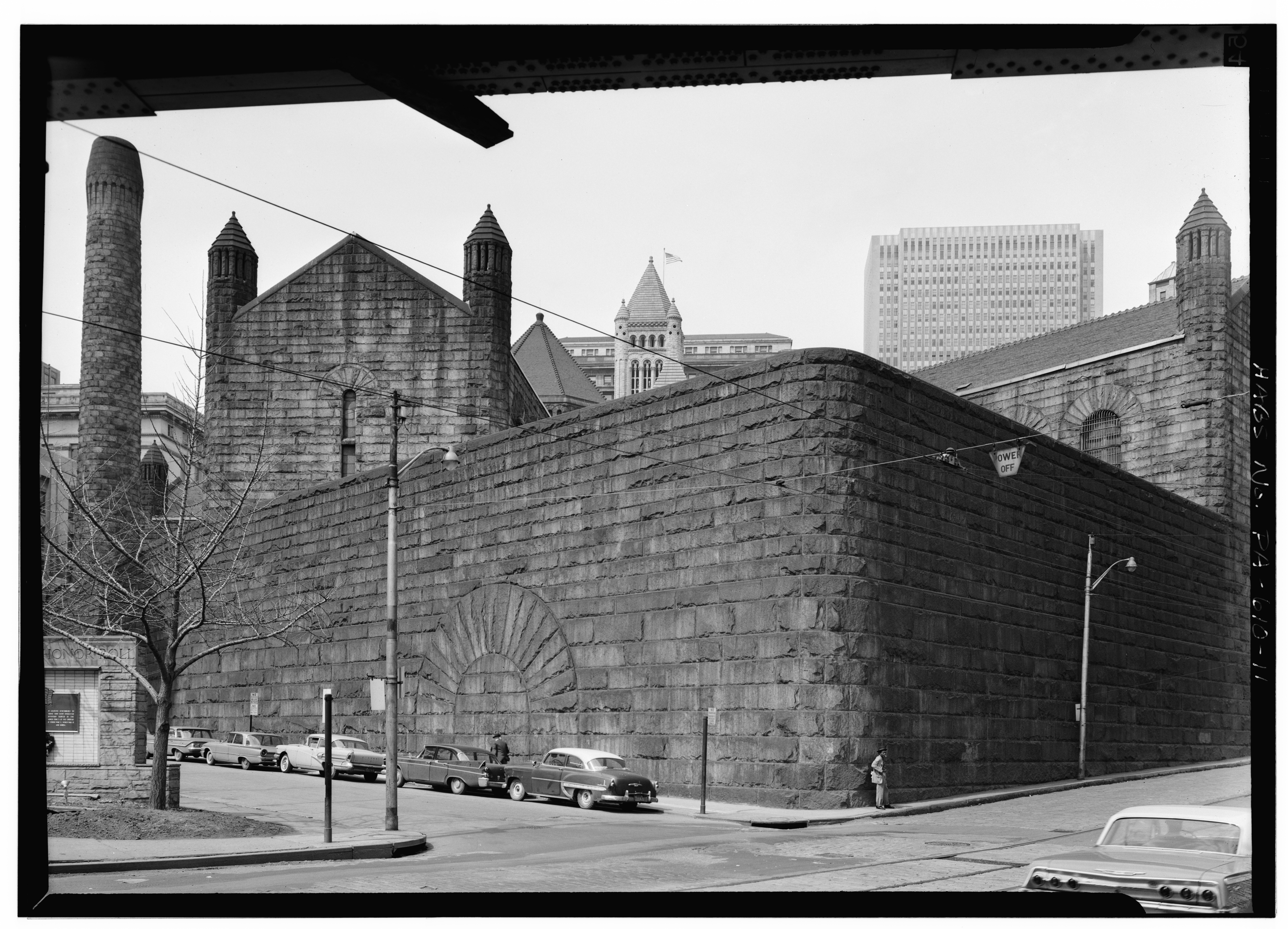
The wall of the old jail's yard

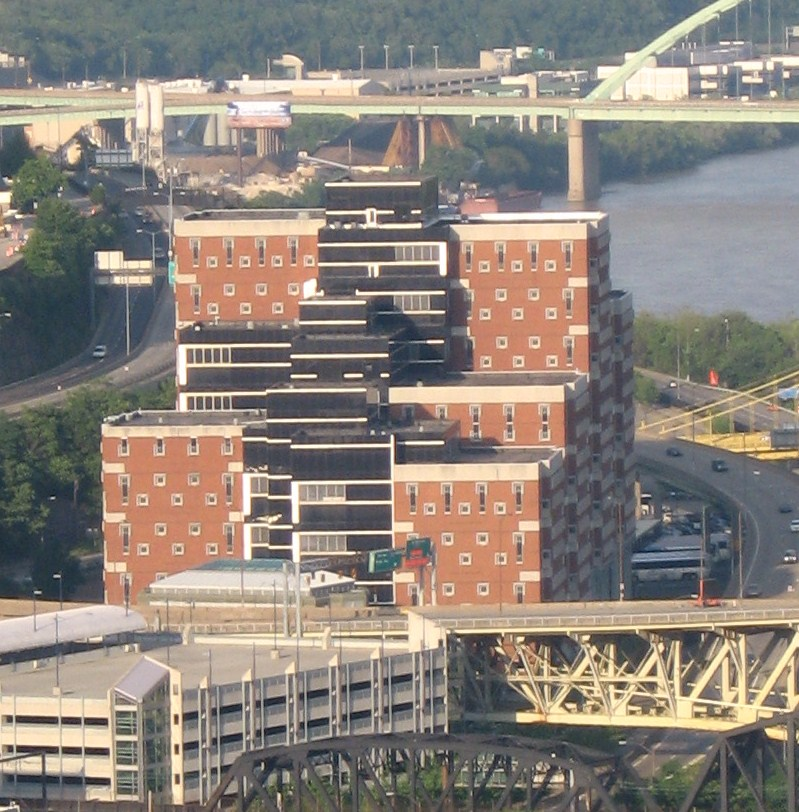
The new jail viewed from Mount Washington
