= Wallace Williams (politician) =

American politician (died 1974)

Member of the Maryland Senate from the Cecil County district
- In office 1931–1935
- Preceded by: Cecil Clyde Squier
- Succeeded by: Harold E. Cobourn

Personal details
- Born: Chesapeake City, Maryland, U.S.
- Died: December 13, 1974 (aged 82)
- Party: Republican
- Spouse: Elisabeth Bulkley Smith (m. 1920)
- Children: 3
- Parent: Frank E. Williams (father)
- Occupation: Politician; farmer; businessman

Wallace Williams (died December 13, 1974) was an American politician from Maryland. He served as a member of the Maryland Senate, representing Cecil County from 1931 to 1935.

== Early life ==
Wallace Williams was born in Chesapeake City, Maryland, to Frank E. Williams. His father was a state senator.

== Career ==
Williams served as a captain in the U.S. Army during World War I.

Williams was a member of the Maryland Senate, representing Cecil County from 1931 to 1935. In 1932, Millard E. Tydings defeated Williams in the election for U.S. senate. In June 1941, Governor Herbert O'Conor appointed Wallace as commander of the fifth battalion of the Maryland State Guard.

Williams operated a dairy farm in the Elkton area. He built the Canada Dry Bottling Company of Wilmington in 1947 and ran the business until 1970. With his son Wallace Jr. he built and operated the Brantwood Golf Club, south of Elkton. He was Maryland state commander of the American Legion.

== Personal life ==
Williams married Elisabeth Bulkley Smith, daughter of William B. Smith, of Montclair, New Jersey, on June 5, 1920. They had a son and two daughters, Wallace Jr., Lois W. and Mrs. Joseph Trippetti. Later in life, he lived at Regency Square Apartments in Fairfield.

Williams died on December 13, 1974, aged 82, at Episcopal Church Home.
