= Edwin Evans Ewing =

American Writer, poet & newspaperman (1824-1901)

- Born: 9 January 1824; Cecil County, Maryland, United States
- Died: August 20, 1901 (aged 77); Rising Sun, Maryland, United States
- Occupation(s): Writer, poet, newspaperman
- Spouses: Clara Vaughan (m. 1863; died 1863) Emma McMurphy (m. 1865)
- Children: 4
- Parents: Patrick Ewing Jr (father); Isabella Evans (mother)

Edwin Evans Ewing (9 January 1824 – 20 August 1901) was a writer, poet, and newspaperman from Cecil County, Maryland. He published a number of poems in local Cecil and Lancaster County newspapers in his youth, and also published two novels.

== Early life ==
Ewing was the oldest of the seven children born to Patrick Ewing Jr. and Isabella Evans of Rowlandsville, Maryland. He spent his childhood living on his father's farm on Octoraro Creek, attending school in the winter and helping with the farm in the summer. Once he turned sixteen, he divided his time between farm work and writing poetry.

== Career ==
His first published novel, "The Hag of the Wallowish," originally appeared as a serial in The Philadelphia Dollar Newspaper beginning on October 10, 1849. Ewing based the characters in his novel off of his neighbors, and the "Wallowish" represented the Octoraro Creek. In 1868, the story was published by Irwin and Erastus Beadle under the title, "The Witch of the Wallowish." Ewing's second novel, called, "The Bee Hunter," was published in 1866.

After a trip to Texas in 1856, Ewing wrote about his travel experiences in a series of letters published in the Cecil Whig of Elkton, Maryland. He later purchased the Whig in 1861, which he edited for several years and then sold in 1876. Ewing and his family moved to Topeka, Kansas, where he purchased the Kansas Farmer and the Juvenile Magazine, and also established the Daily Capital. In 1882 he moved briefly to Macon County, North Carolina and established the Blue Ridge Enterprise, and then in 1885 finally returned to Maryland, where he purchased the Rising Sun Journal, which still publishes today under the name The Midland Journal.

== Family ==
Edwin Ewing's great grandfather, Joshua Ewing, was the first representative of the Ewing family to settle in America, doing so in the late eighteenth century. His grandfather, Patrick Ewing, was a captain in the Continental army. Edwin had a brother, William Pinkney Ewing, who also wrote and contributed poetry.

Ewing was married in 1863 to Clara Vaughan of Camden, New Jersey. She died that same year, on December 21, six days after giving birth to their daughter Clara. In 1865, Ewing got married a second time, this time to Emma McMurphy of Elkton, Maryland. Together they had three sons: Cecil, Evans, and Halus.
