= Automotive industry in Ireland =

The automotive industry in Ireland has had a varied history. The punitive tax on imported cars encouraged a wide range of companies to assemble their cars locally including Fiat, Ford and Renault. From Ireland's entry to the European Union in 1973, the need for locally produced cars to avoid import taxes reduced and since the 1980s, production ended and all cars are now imported.

== History ==
The Alesbury automobile was exhibited in Dublin in 1907, but manufacture lasted only from then until 1908.

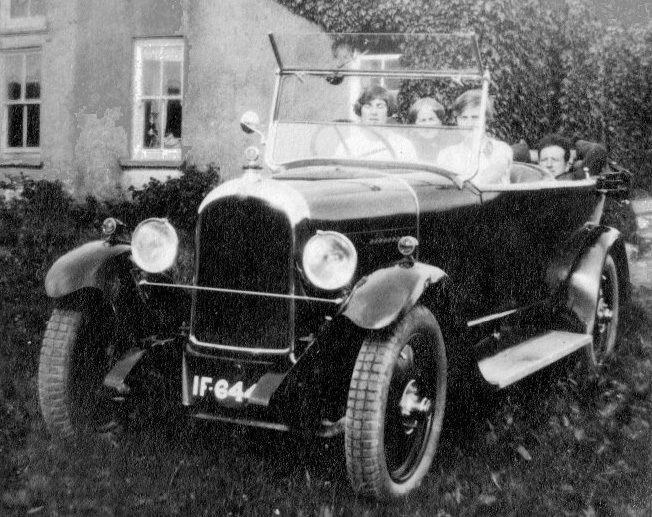
Citroen C4 "Torpedo" with a Cork registration

In 1917, Ford opened a plant in Cork, initially for tractor manufacture as Fordson, but from 1921, cars were built as well. The Henry Ford & Son Ltd factory was the first to be purpose-built by Ford in Europe, starting its life on the site of an old Cork racecourse. The factory produced a range of models, including the Prefect, Escort, Cortina, and production ended with the Sierra in 1984. The factory site extended over 18 acres and employed 7,000 people.

Motor Distributors started to import Volkswagen Beetles in 1950 packed in crates in what was termed 'completely knocked down' (CKD) form ready to be assembled, and was the first Volkswagen ever built outside Germany. The vehicles were assembled in a former tram depot in Shelbourne Road in Ballsbridge, which is now the premises for Ballsbridge Motors who are still a Volkswagen dealer. Irish-assembled Beetles rose from an output of 46 units in 1950 to 2,155 units in 1952. This necessitated a move in 1955 to a new factory premises on the Naas Road. Assembly of the Beetle continued there until 1980, when production of the car ceased in Europe. Volkswagen vehicle assembly continued in Dublin until the mid-1980s. During the same period, the Volkswagen Transporter van was also assembled. Motor Distributors also assembled Renault in the late 50s early 60s.

Fiat had an assembly plant in Summerhill. O'Neill were Dodge agents. Vauxhall cars and Bedford commercials were assembled in Santry by McCairn's Motors. Reg Armstrong, of motorbike racing fame, had an assembly plant in Ringsend for NSU and Opel. For a time, there was also an Opel assembly plant in Cork; the Republic of Ireland was divided into north and south sales areas for Opel. The Cork assembler O'Shea also had the Zetor tractor and Skoda car franchise.

The Heinkel Kabine was produced for a short period in 1958. The Shamrock was a short-lived car with a short production of only eight cars in the 1960s in Castleblaney, County Monaghan.

A large number of British cars were assembled in Ireland from CKD kits from the 1920s to the 1960s, up to 1974. Austin cars and commercial models were assembled by Lincoln & Nolan, Morris cars were assembled by the Brittain's Group, who subsequently acquired Lincoln & Nolan. Morris Commercials, MG, Riley, and Wolseley cars were assembled by Booth Poole, which was also taken over by Brittains.

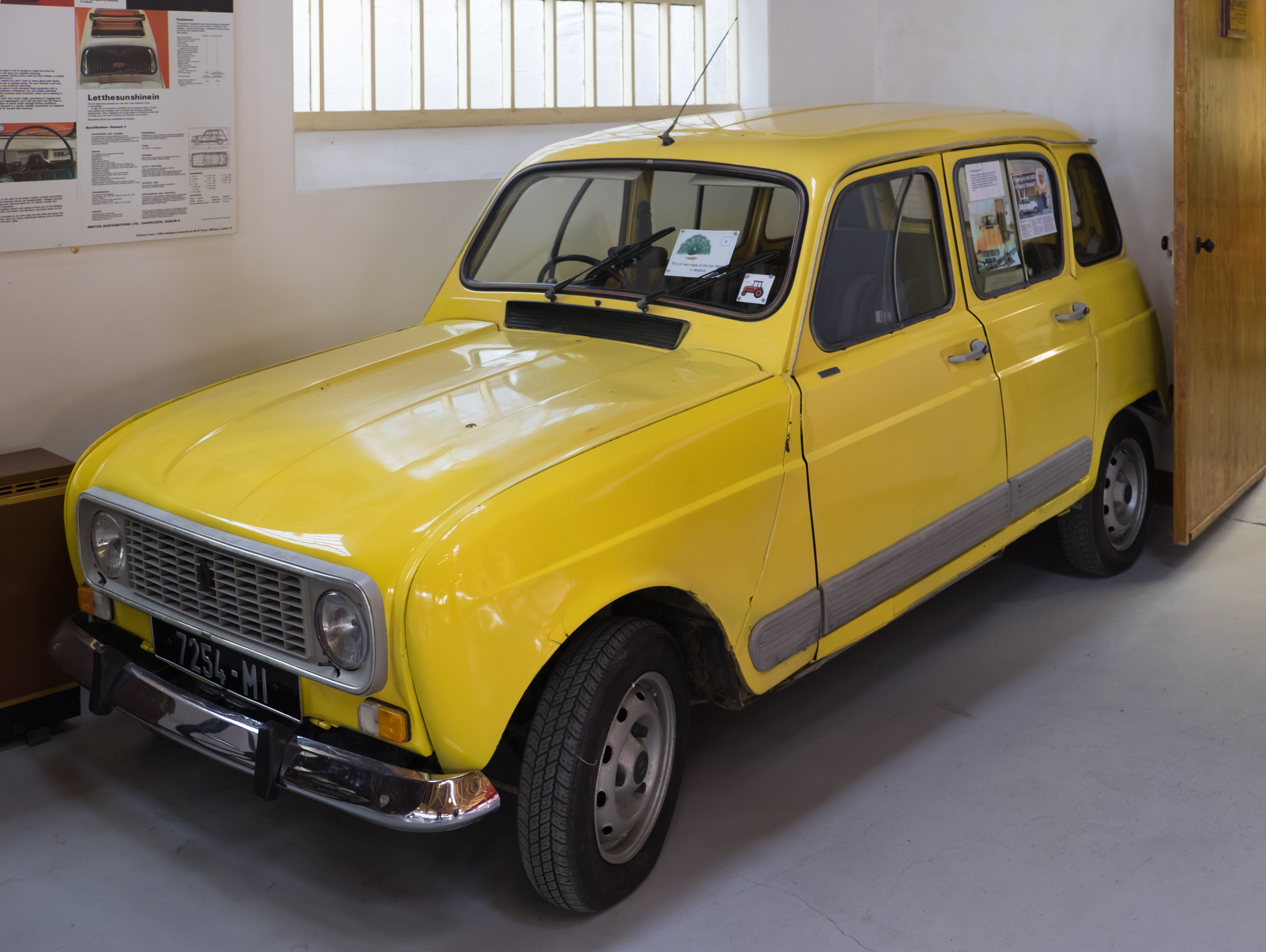
A Renault R4 GTL built in 1982 in Wexford

Thompson Motor Co. built a new factory in Wexford in 1965, where it assembled the Renault 4, with almost 200 employees producing 35 cars a day. It later went on to produce the TMC Costin, a lightweight sports car, from 1983 to 1987.

The 1970s Hillman Hunter was assembled in Santry until production ended in 1979.

In 1982, Vauxhall models ceased to be sold, with all General Motors cars carrying the Opel badge.

=== Buses ===
Until the early 1970s, CIÉ built its own buses at its Spa Road factory in Dublin, which was taken over by Van Hool McArdle in 1974 but closed in 1978. In 1980, GAC Ireland was established in Shannon, but closed in 1986, leaving the Republic of Ireland needing to import buses thereafter.

== Northern Ireland ==
The short-lived DeLorean Motor Company operated in Dunmurry, a suburb of Belfast, from 1978 until the company's bankruptcy in 1982. It produced an estimated 9,000 DeLoreans.

== Motorsport ==
The 1903 Gordon Bennett Cup was the first international motorsport event to be held in Ireland.

The Irish International Grand Prix was held for only three years from 1929.

The Circuit of Ireland Rally is an annual automobile rally, which was first held in 1931, making it the third oldest rally in the world.

Mondello Park, Ireland's only international motorsport venue, was established in 1968.

== Passenger car sales ==
Passenger car sales have varied greatly from a peak of 230,795 in the year 2000 and a Celtic Tiger high of 186,325 in 2007 to a low of 57,453 in the wake of the Irish property crash and the Post-2008 Irish banking crisis.

The opening of the Luas red and green lines in 2004 and the expanded Luas opening in 2017, the establishment of Dublinbikes in 2009 along with Coca-Cola Zero bikes across other Irish cities in 2014, the further expansion of cycling infrastructure in Dublin along with other shared bike schemes and the deregulation of taxi services (between 2000 and 2008 the number of taxi licences rose from 3,913 to 21,177, Hailo launching in 2012) has also helped to reduce or defer the need by consumers to buy passenger cars.

More recently, increased car and fuel taxes and environmental concerns have also begun to have an effect on the demand for cars, and particularly traditional fuel-type cars.

Year (period)	Number of passenger cars sold
1997	136,662
1998	145,702
1999	174,242
2000	230,795
2001	164,730
2002	156,125
2003	145,223
2004	154,136
2005	171,742
2006	178,484
2007	186,325
2008	151,607
2009	57,453
2010	88,443
2011	89,904
2012	79,574
2013	74,367
2014	96,284
2015	124,945
2016	146,603
2017	131,335
2018	125,557
2019	117,100
2020	117,100
2021	117,100
2022	105,398
2023	122,444
2024	121,230
2025	73,562

== See also ==
- Motor tax in the Republic of Ireland
- Vehicle registration plates of the Republic of Ireland
