= Spa Road (disambiguation) =

Spa Road is a street in Gloucester, England.

Spa Road may also refer to:

- Spa Road, Bermondsey, a street in London
- Spa Road Works, Dublin, Ireland, manufacturer of trams and buses
- Spa Road railway station, Bermondsey, London, a former station
- Spa Road Junction, a railway junction in Bermondsey, London
