= Haulpak =

Brand of off-highway mining trucks

- Industry: Off-highway mining trucks
- Founded: 1953
- Defunct: 1999
- Successor: Komatsu

Haulpak was a very successful line of off-highway mining trucks. The name was used from 1953 until around 1999; the line continues under the Komatsu name. The name was adopted as Wabco Haulpak when R. G. LeTourneau's business was bought by Wabco, and the Haulpak name continued through Wabco's purchase by American Standard, the operation's purchase by Dresser Industries, the merger into Komatsu-Dresser, and for a time after Komatsu took complete ownership from Dresser.

== History ==
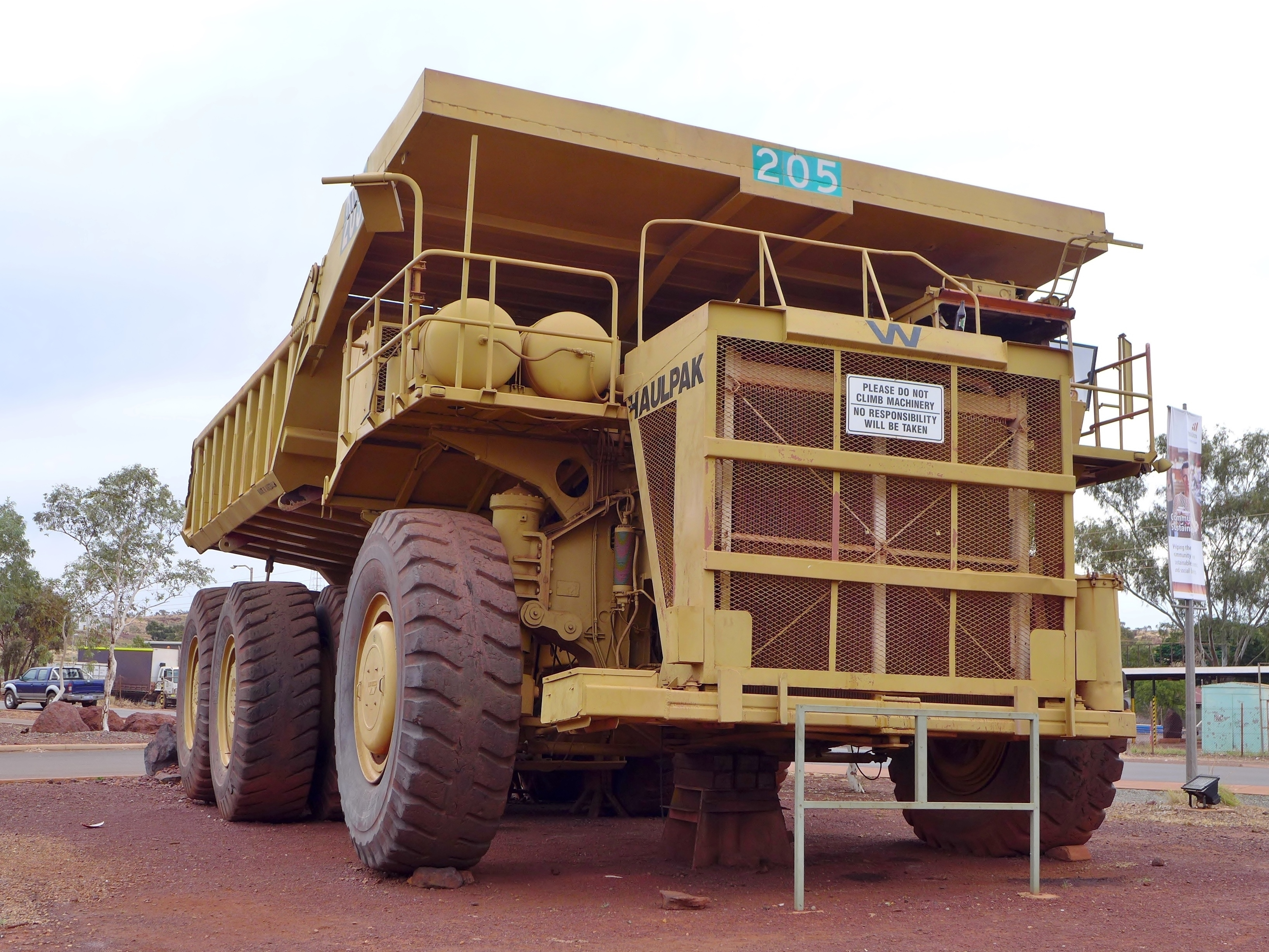
A preserved WABCO Haulpak in Newman, Western Australia

The origins of the Haulpak line began with the purchase of R. G. LeTourneau's construction machinery business in 1953 by Westinghouse Air Brake Company. Wabco had traditionally been a manufacturer of railway air brake systems, but ventured into construction machinery with the purchase of LeRoi air tools and industrial drills in 1952. The subsequent purchase of R. G. LeTourneau's construction machinery line gave Wabco a comprehensive range of machinery including scrapers, rubber-tyred dozers and other attachments. Wabco subsequently added motor graders to their product line by purchasing J. D. Adams in 1955 and thereafter front end loaders, with the purchase of Scoopmobile. Wabco recognised the importance of the off-highway Truck market and hired Ralph H. Kress to design a line of haul trucks in-house. Kress incorporated many new design features which were trend setting and eventually Caterpillar was to offer him a position designing their range of haulers.

The Haulpak line of mining and quarry trucks was the best-performing sector for Wabco for the entire time they owned it and eventually the scrapers, wheel dozers, graders and front end loaders would be discontinued from the Wabco catalogue. In 1968 Wabco had become part of American Standard Company (known for bathroom fittings) and then it would become part of Dresser Industries in 1984. After a Komatsu Limited-Dresser joint venture (KDC) in 1988 was formed, the Haulpak truck line was again (partly) under new ownership, although by 1994 Komatsu had purchased all remaining shares of KDC, making it a wholly owned subsidiary. The Haulpak name was quietly discontinued around 1998–1999 and the new trucks were then known as Komatsu machines.

While the smaller Komatsu haul trucks are distinctly Japanese in design, the current line of larger trucks can trace their heritage back to American Haulpak design roots.

== Truck models ==
- 25, 25C
- 30, 30C
- 35, 35C
- 45, 50, 50B
- 60, 60B
- 65, 65B
- 65E
- 75A, 75B, 75C
- 85C, 85D (became 325M)
- 100 (became 385M)
- 120A, 120B, 120C, 120D (became 445E)
- 140CM, 140DM (became 510E), 530M, 1500-5, 1500-7
- 150B, 150C
- 170C, 170D
- 190 (became 630E, but not a direct replacement)
- 3200, 3200B
- 685E (became 730E, but not a direct replacement)
- 780 (concept; became 830E, the best selling "electric" 240 tonne class truck ever)
- 860E
- 930E (the best selling truck in the 320 tonne size)
- 960E
- 980E

== See also ==
- Haul truck
- R. G. LeTourneau
- Westinghouse Air Brake Company
- American Standard Brands
