= Pearson's Coupling =

Coupling mechanism for railway carriages

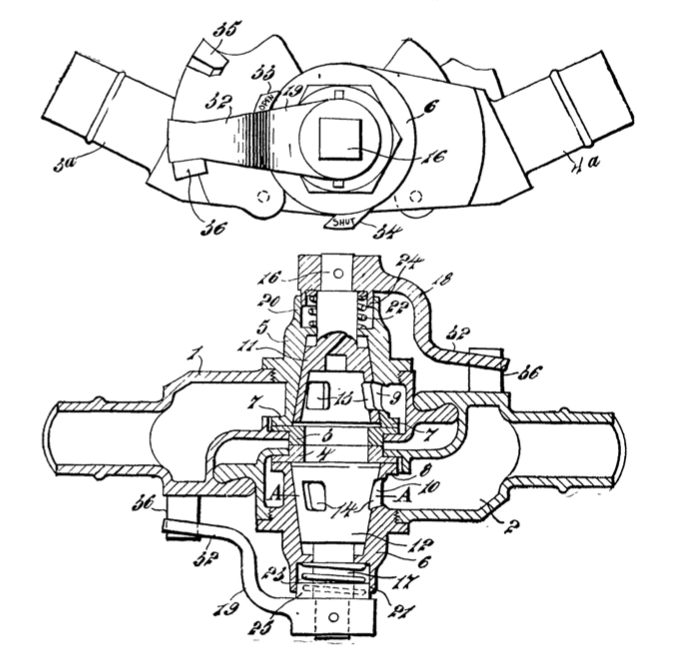
Pearson's Coupling - Side Elevation and Sectional Plan, 1909

Pearson's Coupling was a safety relevant improvement for connecting the hoses of the Westinghouse Air Brake Company between railway carriages.

== History ==
If a train was accidentally divided, the drawing apart of the hose pipes would cause the brakes to be applied on both sections of the severed train. However, in shunting operations, it was necessary to have an arrangement by which the carriages may be disconnected when required, without the application of the brakes. Thus, a train-cock was installed at each end of the carriage where the hose-pipes were attached. If the hose-pipes were disconnected, and the train-cocks left open, the brakes were applied throughout the train. Therefore, train-cocks had to be provided.

The not infrequent forgetfulness of a shunter to open the train-cocks after coupling-up the hose-pipes has caused accidents in the past. A further risk in connection with these cocks lied in the fact that they could be tampered with by passengers. Out of eleven accidents in New Zealand, eight have been the result of somebody's negligence in leaving train-cocks closed.

In Pearson's invention the cocks are necessarily closed and the levers engaged by the lugs, before the heads could be coupled together. The action of turning the heads upon one another, while the levers were engaged by the lugs caused the cocks to open, because the ports of the plugs registered with the ports in the cocks, leaving the brakes in a condition ready to be applied. The heads could not be uncoupled in the ordinary way without the operations being reversed and the cocks left open. If the heads were accidentally pulled apart, as by the severance of a train, the cocks remained open, and the brakes were thereby applied.

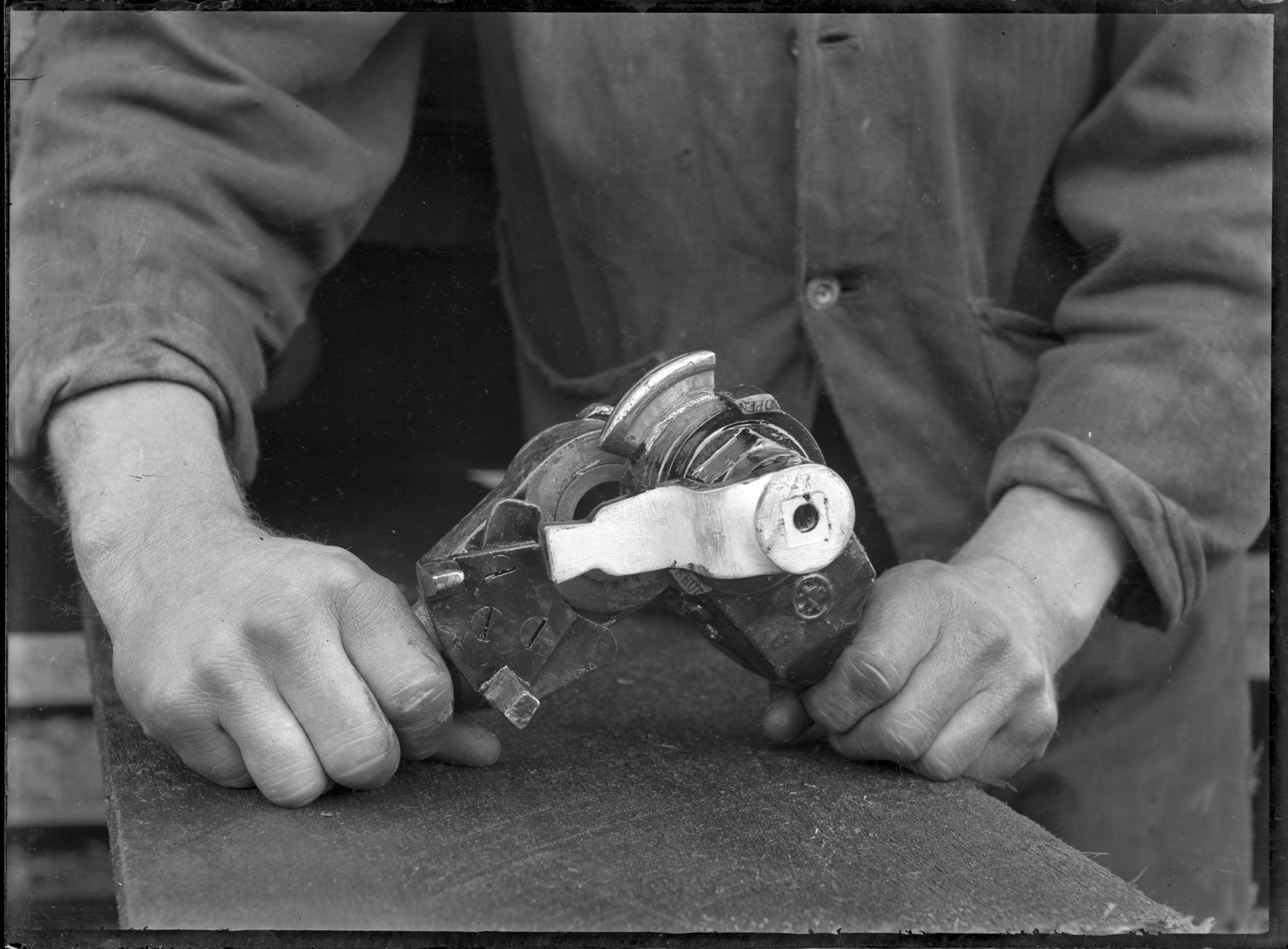
Pearson's Westinghouse brake coupling for railway use

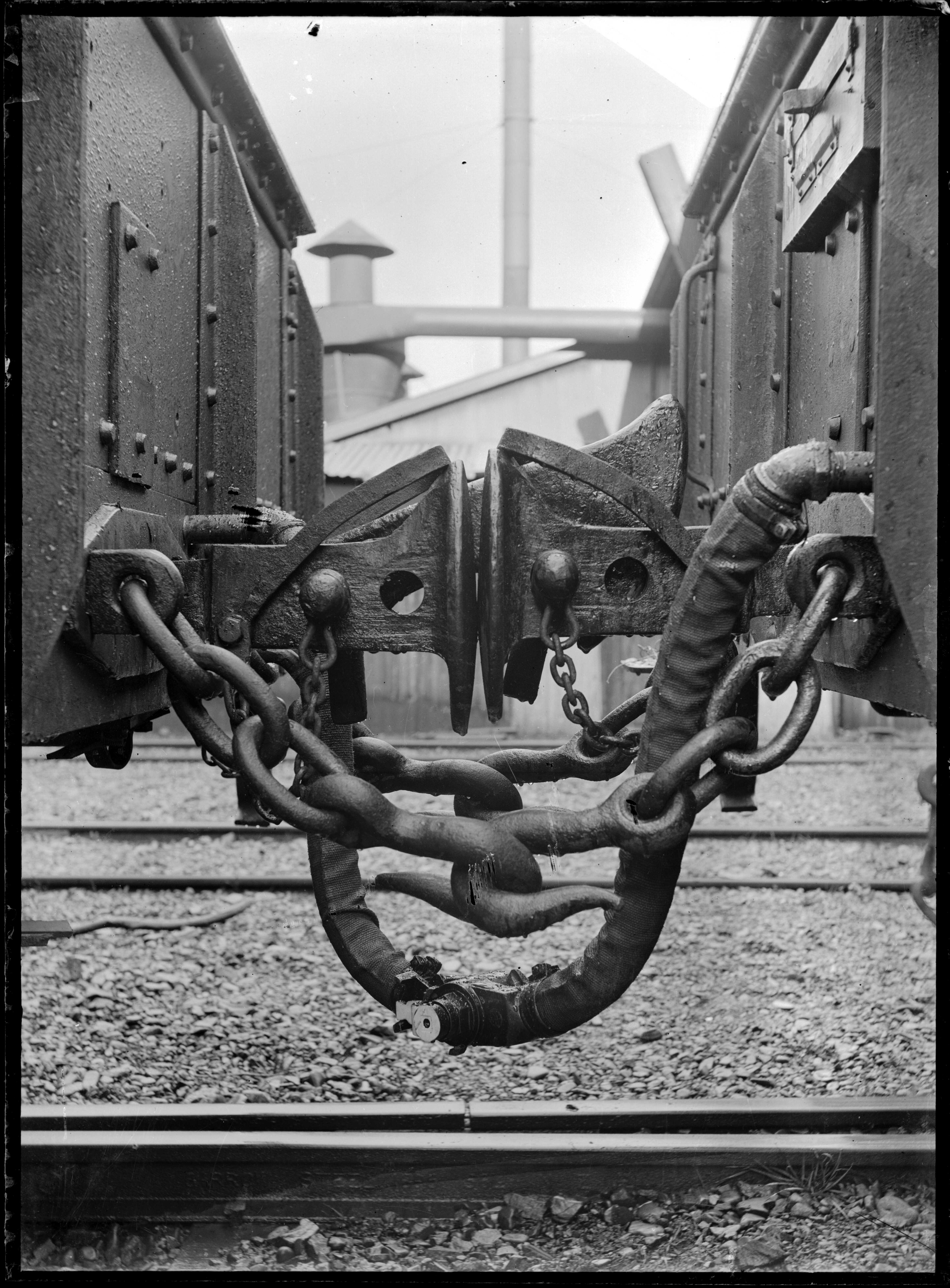
Pearson's Westinghouse brake coupling

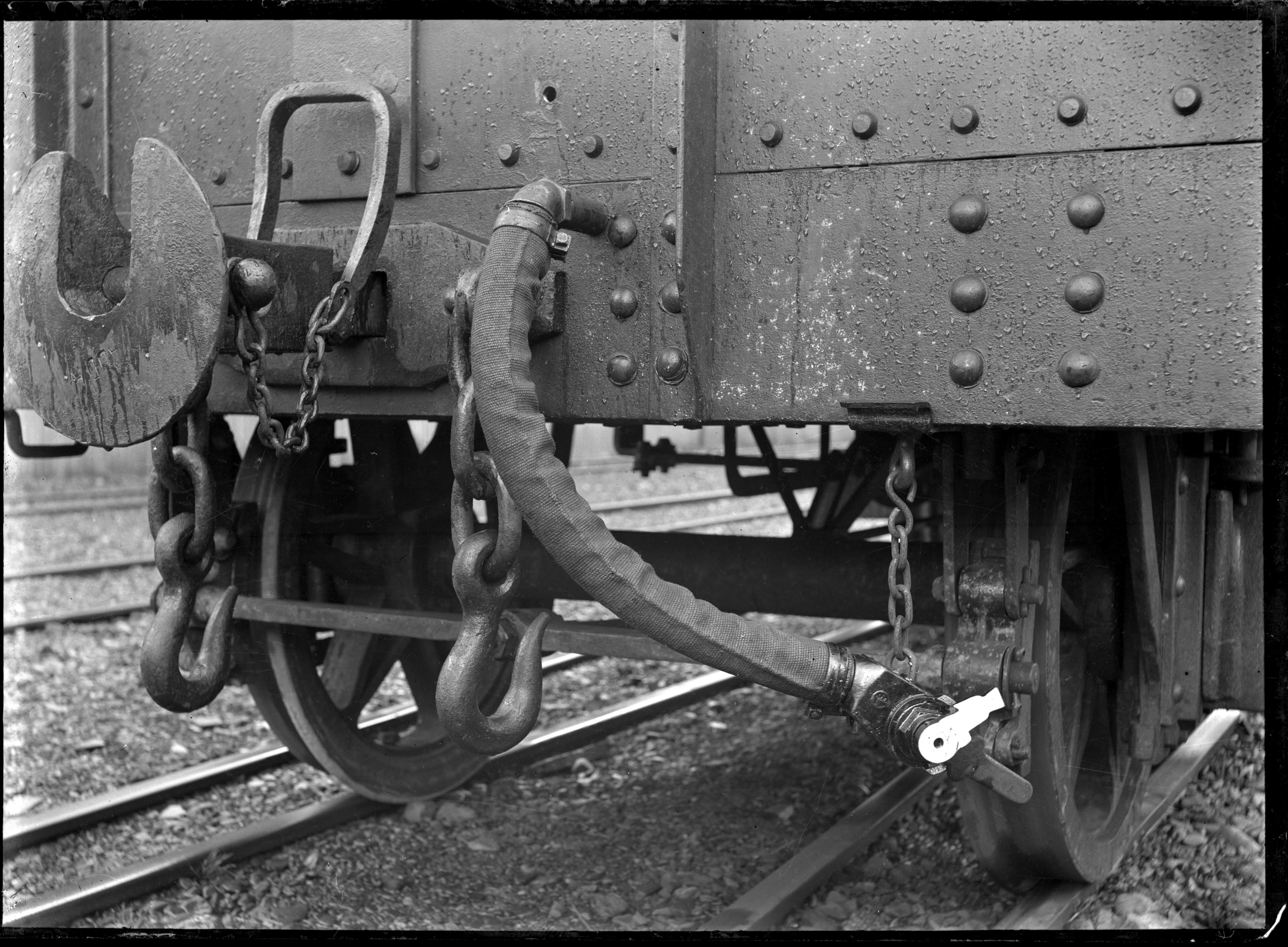
Pearson's Westinghouse brake coupling
