= Ralph Kress =

Ralph Kress may mean:

- Red Kress (1907–1962), American baseball player whose real name was Ralph
- Ralph H. Kress (1904–1995), American engineer responsible for off-road construction and mining trucks
