= Dick Evans (end) =

Former American football end

Profile
- Position: End

Personal information
- Born: April 26, 1938; Wilmerding, Pennsylvania, U.S.
- Died: November 7, 2019 (aged 81)
- Listed height: 6 ft 2 in (1.88 m)
- Listed weight: 185 lb (84 kg)

Career information
- College: VMI (1957–1959)

John Richard Evans (April 26, 1938 – November 7, 2019) was an American football end. He played college football for the VMI Keydets from 1957 to 1959. As a senior in 1959, he led the Southern Conference and ranked second nationally with 698 receiving yards. He also led the conference and ranked second nationally with an average of 19.9 yards per reception. His tally of 54 points ranked second in the conference, and his nine receiving touchdowns ranked second nationally. Evans' tally of 698 receiving yards also broke the Southern Conference season record of 588 yards set one year earlier by Ray Siminski of Furman. At the end of the 1959 season, the Associated Press selected Evans as the honorary captain of its 1959 All-Big Five football team.
