= Brockman 4 mine =

Iron ore mine in Australia

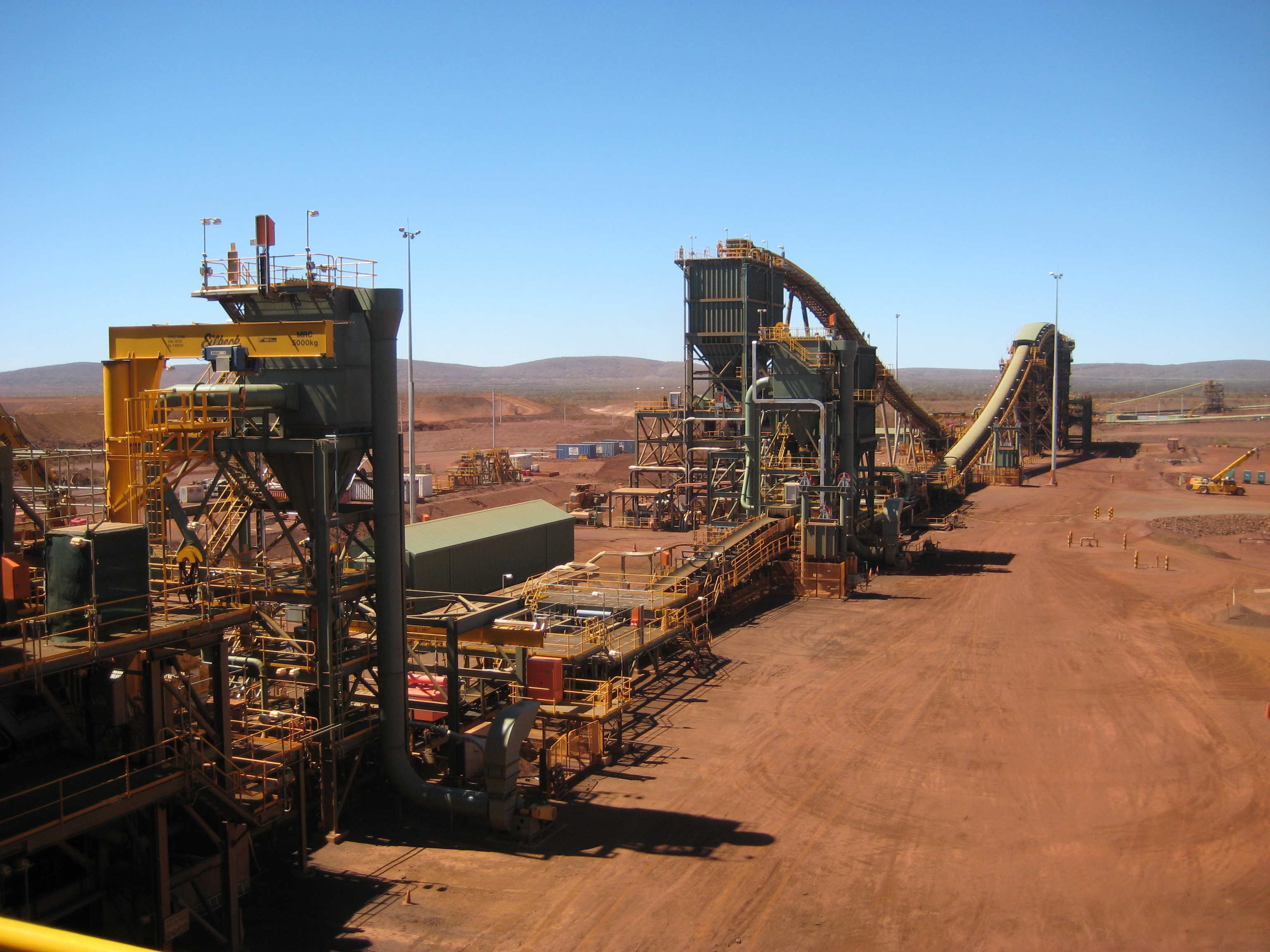

- Location in Western Australia
- Interactive map of Brockman 4 mine
- Location: Shire of Ashburton, Pilbara, Western Australia, Australia; 22°34′31″S 117°16′07″E
- Products: Iron ore
- Production: 22 Mt/annum
- Opened: 2010
- Company: Rio Tinto Iron Ore
- Website: Rio Tinto Iron Ore website

The Brockman 4 mine is an iron ore mine located in the Pilbara region of Western Australia, 60 km (37 mi) north-west of Tom Price. The mine, located near the existing Brockman mine, was opened in 2010. The mine is fully owned and operated by Rio Tinto Iron Ore, which owns many mines in the area. The mine is serviced by the Boolgeeda Airport.

In May 2020, Rio Tinto achieved notoriety for its blasting of archaeologically highly significant and also culturally sensitive Australian Aboriginal sacred sites in Juukan Gorge in order to expand Brockman 4. A government inquiry was established to investigate the incident on 11 June 2020.

The Hamersley Range, where the mine is located, is, with 80% of all identified iron ore reserves in Australia, one of the major iron ore provinces in the world.

== Overview ==
Iron ore mines in the Pilbara region

Brockman 4 is located approximately 25 km (16 mi) south of the Brockman 2 mine. The mine, which cost US$1.520 billion to build, was initially scheduled to produce 22 Mt annually, with a doubling of capacity planned by 2012, to help achieve Rio Tinto's goal of raising iron ore production from the Pilbara from 220 Mt annually (as of 2010) to 330 Mt.

As of 2013, the ore body is approximately 15 km (9.3 mi) long and up to 3 km (1.9 mi) wide, comprising the hills to the south of the Boolgeeda Creek Valley. Mining incorporates a fleet of fifteen Komatsu 830E haul trucks. The ore is processed on site in the plant to produce lump (<31.5mm, >6mm) and fines (<6mm) product. There is a primary jaw crusher, two secondary cone crushers, a six bin screening building and a 1.2 Mt capacity stockyard. Stockpiled ore is loaded onto rail and then transported to the coast through the Hamersley & Robe River railway, where it is loaded onto ships.

The mine's workforce is on a fly-in fly-out roster.

Brockman 4 was estimated to have a mine life of 20 years. It was officially opened on 2 September 2010. Rio Tinto allocated a further A$1.24 billion in early December 2010, to expand the mine as well as develop its Western Turner Syncline project, with the aim of increasing the Pilbara production to 283 Mt per annum by late 2013. The expansion would make B4 Rio Tinto's second-largest mine in the Pilbara.
