= GAC Ireland =

Irish bus and coach manufacturer

- Founded: 11 November 1980
- Defunct: 12 September 1986
- Headquarters: Shannon, County Clare, Ireland
- Products: Buses
- Owner: General Automotive Corporation

GAC Ireland was a bus and coach manufacturer based in Shannon, County Clare, Ireland. It traded from 11 November 1980 until 12 September 1986, and almost all the vehicles it built were for the Irish state-owned transport company Córas Iompair Éireann (CIÉ) with the first delivery out of a 749 order in November 1980.

== Beginnings and FFG prototypes ==
During the 1970s, CIÉ's long-standing relationship with Leyland became strained, and in 1977 the company decided upon a standard "family" for its next generation of buses and coaches. It thus contacted FFG (Fahrzeugwerkstätten Falkenried GmbH) of Hamburg, Germany, which built six prototype vehicles: a 45-seat coach, a 72-seat double-deck bus, a 35-seat citybus, two 47-seat rural/school buses and a wheelchair-accessible midibus. Furthermore, the Dublin-based Van Hool McArdle bus manufacturing joint venture ceased operations in 1978 (it had taken over the bus manufacturing operations of CIÉ several years earlier), leaving the Irish Government keen to re-establish bus manufacturing in Ireland.

Aside from the midibus, all of these vehicles shared common body components, the most notable being large, inward-curving two-piece windscreens. The coach, double-decker and citybus were all fitted with General Motors Detroit Diesel engines, while the rural/school buses were fitted with DAF and Daimler-Benz engines respectively.

The midibus, built in 1981 as a token response to the International Year of Disabled Persons, also carried a Daimler-Benz engine, and featured a sliding door at the front, immediately to the driver's left. Unlike the other models, it did not go into production, and saw very little use.

CIÉ looked for partners to build these buses in Ireland, eventually finding two: the Canadian conglomerate Bombardier, and the United States-based General Automotive Corporation (GAC) from Ann Arbor, Michigan. The two companies formed a new company Bombardier Ireland Limited, 51% owned by Bombardier and 49% owned by GAC. In August 1983, Bombardier sold its shares to GAC, with the company renamed GAC Ireland Limited.

The former Rippon piano factory in the new town of Shannon, County Clare was leased, and production commenced in 1980, with 51 of the KE type InterCity/tour buses, with some KD double deck production taking place around the same time.

The idea behind the Bombardier/GAC project was inspired by a number of factors:

1. CIÉ's requirement for new buses as a matter of urgency, and their preference not to purchase any more Leyland products
2. To address a serious unemployment issue in the local area caused as a result of the Rippon piano factory's closure. There is no doubt that local and national political influences had their part to play in this project as Ireland was in a deep recession at the time, although the Shannon project was doomed to failure in later years.
3. It was intended that CIÉ would commission design of a "family" of buses, designed by FFG in Hamburg, to their own specification, with identical and interchangeable body and mechanical parts throughout the bus "family" and it would greatly reduce the logistical and financial problems associated with running a mixed fleet of buses.
4. With the closure in 1977 of Spa Road coachworks, CIÉ would supply all the bus-building equipment and materials for the contractor (Bombardier/GAC) to build the buses to CIÉ design, who in turn employed the manufacturing staff. The jobs created in Shannon would then create thousands of "spin-off" jobs through suppliers to the new bus-building plant. CIÉ would purchase an agreed consignment of vehicles every year to make the factory "break even", and any extra buses that the manufacturer could produce themselves and sell to the export marked would provide their profits. Although the build-to-export plan was good in theory, it turned out in the end to be an unsuccessful enterprise.

== KC – Single Decker / Citybus ==
The prototype Bombardier "KC" Citybus (of single deck design) was built in 1979/1980 by FFG in Hamburg, Germany. Although designated "V1" in the factory, it later received fleet number KC1 when entering service with CIÉ, and was allocated to Conyngham Road depot from new in 1981 to its final days in 1996 when it was withdrawn. This particular vehicle differed from the other Shannon built KC type buses (built 1983–1986) as it was delivered in the tan (sometimes mistaken for orange) or the CIÉ coined "buttermilk" livery and unique "blue" interior as seen on prototype double-decker "KD 1", and the rest of the Leyland Atlantean/Leyland Leopard CIÉ fleet at the time. KC1 was later repainted into the 2-tone green as worn by the rest of the Bombardier/GAC fleet before or shortly after it entered service. KC1 was fitted with a supercharged 2-stroke Detroit Diesel 6V-71 engine and an Allison V730 automatic transmission. The axles were Rockwell/GKN axles and the general mechanical running gear was identical to the KD/KE type buses, although the gear ratios would be more like the KD citybus (slow moving traffic) than the KE InterCity coach (which was built for InterCity, high speed driving).

In late 1983, Bombardier (Canada), on foot of lack of international orders and a significant decline in promised orders from CIE, then withdrew their participation from the joint business with GAC, leaving GAC Ireland to take over the entire running of the business as a sole entity. This event occurred just at the end of KD production and the beginning of KC production.

Production of the Shannon built KC class (KC2-202) began in October 1983 and the most notable change from the KD bus was the fitting of a 4-stroke, turbocharged Cummins L10-185 engine and a Voith D851 gearbox, which was more economical to run unit, which parts were cheaper and easier tl access than its wholly American counterpart, and from an enthusiastic point of view, this bus has its own distinctive sound, compared to the loud roar from the Detroit 6V-71, which was an American engined, parts were expensive to obtain and the unit had very poor fuel economy being a 2-stroke diesel engine. The axles were also changed from Rockwell/GKN type axles to Kirkstall axles. The Dunlop "pneuride" suspension was retained and was the same type as the KD type, although the length of the KC bus was approximately 1 metre longer than the KD type. The Cummins engine in the KC was a much more "European" engine with parts easier to source than for the Detroit Diesel engine, parts for which had to be largely sourced from Dallas, Texas.

With exception of KC1 and KC2, which were badged as "Bombardiers", the rest of the KC Citybuses were badged "GACs", as by the time KC3 onwards were on the production line, Bombardier had sold their stake and interest in the factory, with GAC taking sole control of the operation, which produced 201 KC type buses out of the Shannon plant. The KC type ran in general service with CIÉ/Dublin Bus/Bus Éireann from 1983 until 2001 and some of the strongest survivors went onto further service as school buses with Bus Éireann until 2005 when the entire KC fleet was withdrawn, some 22 years after they first entered service into CIÉ.

In preservation are as follows:

- KC48 – preserved in Dublin (repainted in Dublin Bus green 2004 – 2nd restoration took place in 2013)
- KC68 – preserved in Dublin (restored at the end of 2011)
- KC100 – preserved by the National Transport Museum of Ireland, Howth, Dublin (in as year 2000/withdrawn condition)
- KC101 – Location & condition unknown as of end 2006
- KC104 – preserved in Dublin (repainted 2003)
- KC106 – preserved in Dublin (in as withdrawn condition)
- KC116 – preserved in Dublin (restored at the end of 2006)
- KC118 – Location & condition unknown
- KC168 – preserved in Dublin (restored at the end of 2006)
- KC175 – preserved in Dublin (in as withdrawn condition)
- KC202 – preserved in Dublin (in as withdrawn condition 2023-present)

== KE – InterCity coach ==
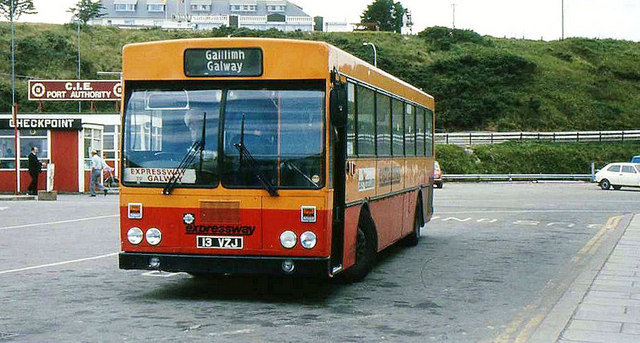
Bombardier KE13 at Rosslare Harbour in July 1988

The first buses produced at the Shannon plant were the 51 KE type intercity/touring coaches for CIÉ, built between 1980 and early 1981. Fifty were built to CIÉ's specification and one prototype was completed in time for the UITP conference in Dublin during 1981.

Powered by the distinctive, noisy 2-stroke Detroit Diesel 6V-71 unit, they were plagued by structural problems from the beginning. The integral body construction (also employed by the KD and KC classes) did not withstand Irish road conditions of the time.

All were withdrawn and scrapped by 1997, although KE14 and KE35 have been preserved.

== KD – Double decker ==
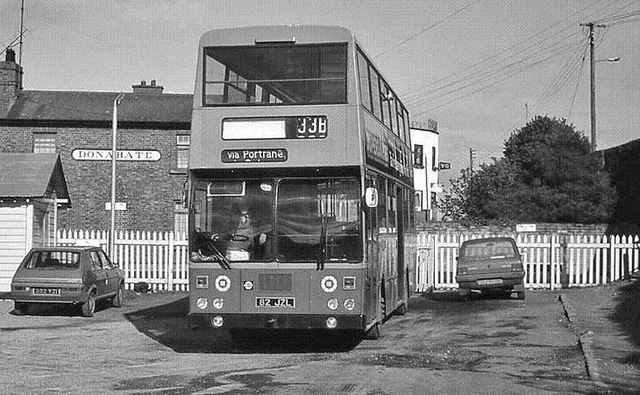
Bombardier KD82 at Donabate station in May 1985

The standard double deck bus offered by Bombardier was known in the CIÉ fleet as the KD type. Bombardier produced 366 double deckers between 1980 and 1983. 365 were right hand drive and all ended up in the CIÉ fleet while a solitary left hand drive bus was constructed for the Baghdad Transport Authority during 1982.

=== Specification ===
The model was based on the prototype bus designed and built by FFG known as B1 (later this bus became KD1 in the CIÉ fleet) for CIÉ. The bus was built on an all welded integral design frame. The model was offered with a choice of engine/gearbox combinations, including the Detroit Diesel 6V71/Allison V730, the Cummins LT10/Voith D851, the Rolls-Royce Eagle/ZF 4HP500 Ecomat and the Gardner 6LXB/ZF 4HP500 Ecomat. The GM combination ran on Rockwell axles, the remaining powerpacks driving on Kirkstall axles. Steering was provided by ZF, suspension by Dunlop pneumatics, shocks by Koni and the air system by Wabco. Door systems on the early production models were made by Keiert of Germany with later buses having Deans Doors systems. SWF provided the wiper system and many electrical components.

The bus was 9.6 metres long, 4.4 metres in height and 2.5 metres wide. The standard tyre size was 275/70R22.5, however the Baghdad example had 11R22.5 tyres.

=== Production ===
Bombardier began production of 'KD-class' double deckers for CIÉ under the build code 'DD' to their standard specification in 1981. These buses featured the Detroit/Allison/Rockwell driveline and were built as 72 seaters (45 upper saloon / 27 lower saloon) with dual door bodies. Bombardier built 364 double deckers to CIÉ's own specifications between 1980 and 1983, 363 of which were powered by Detroit Diesels and one solitary Cummins L10 powered (CIÉ KD 146) bus. Bombardier built two prototypes with the Rolls-Royce Eagle engine, one in 1981 (reg. no. 20 JZL) as a prototype for the UITP conference which was hosted in Dublin that year and another in 1982 as a hope for securing export orders for the Baghdad Transport Authority. 20 JZL became KD191 (191 JZL) in the CIÉ fleet in 1982 and no further export orders were made.

=== In service ===
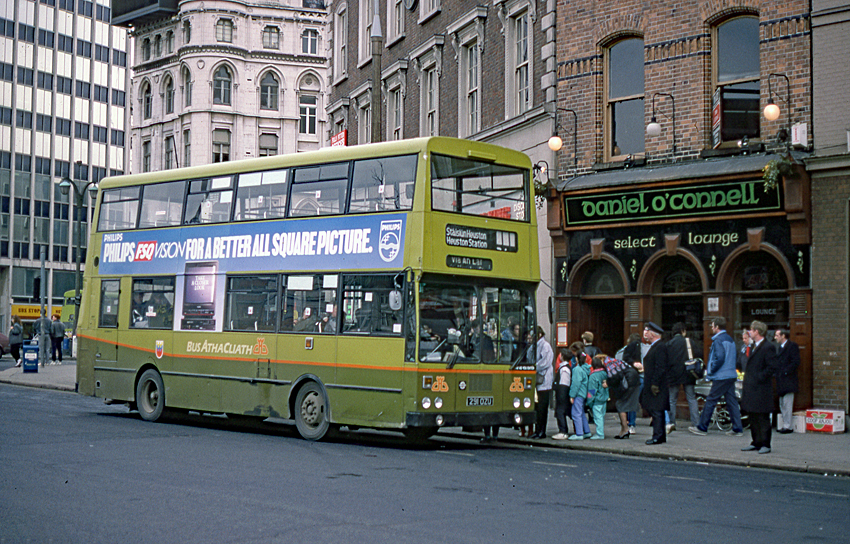
Bombardier KD290 in Dublin in 1988

CIÉ took the prototype bus built by FFG into its fleet as well as 365 of the 366 double decker buses built by Bombardier. The first production bus entered service in late May 1981. KD 2 entered service the day before the prototype FFG built KD 1 from Donnybrook Garage on route 8 (Dublin City Centre – Dalkey). Production began to flow during the summer of 1981 and by August the KDs were entering service in force across the city.

All of the CIÉ KD fleet was in service by September 1983. Most were to be found operating in Dublin but the cities of Cork, Limerick and Galway saw regular KD operation. During the summer months for a number of years Waterford borrowed a KD from Limerick for the Tramore service. When CIÉ was broken up into operating companies in February 1987, of the 364 KDs still in operation (KD 317 was destroyed by fire in Donabate in late 1983), 338 went to Dublin Bus, the remainder to Bus Éireann.

The first withdrawals of the KDs came in 1995 when KD35 was withdrawn from Ringsend garage. Between 1995 and December 2000 the entire Dublin Bus KD fleet was withdrawn, with KD 284 the last withdrawn on 15 December 2000. The training school vehicles ran a little longer with KD 70 being the last to be withdrawn in early February 2001. The bulk of the Bus Éireann KD fleet was withdrawn during 1997 with one KD (KD 184) soldiering on in Cork until May 1999 when a gearbox failure saw its demise.

Bombardier finished the last double decker for CIÉ in August 1983 and thus the end of double deck production.

=== Preserved KDs ===
The following examples of the KD series are currently in preservation as of 2021:

- KD59 (driver training livery) - National Transport Museum of Ireland, Howth, Dublin
- KD70 (driver training livery) (Built In 2026) With Athlone.
- KD199 (driver training livery 2005) - privately preserved
- KD221,
- KD236,
- KD241 (Dublin Bus livery) - privately preserved,
- KD353 (Dublin Bus livery-2014-2024) - National Transport Museum of Ireland, Howth, Dublin

The following examples of the KD series were released for preservation but subsequently scrapped:

- KD156 (driver training livery) - Kells Transport Museum, Cork (stored Louth Commercials), scrapped 2019
- KD184 (Bus Eireann livery) - Kells Transport Museum, Cork, scrapped 2021

== KR – Rural bus ==
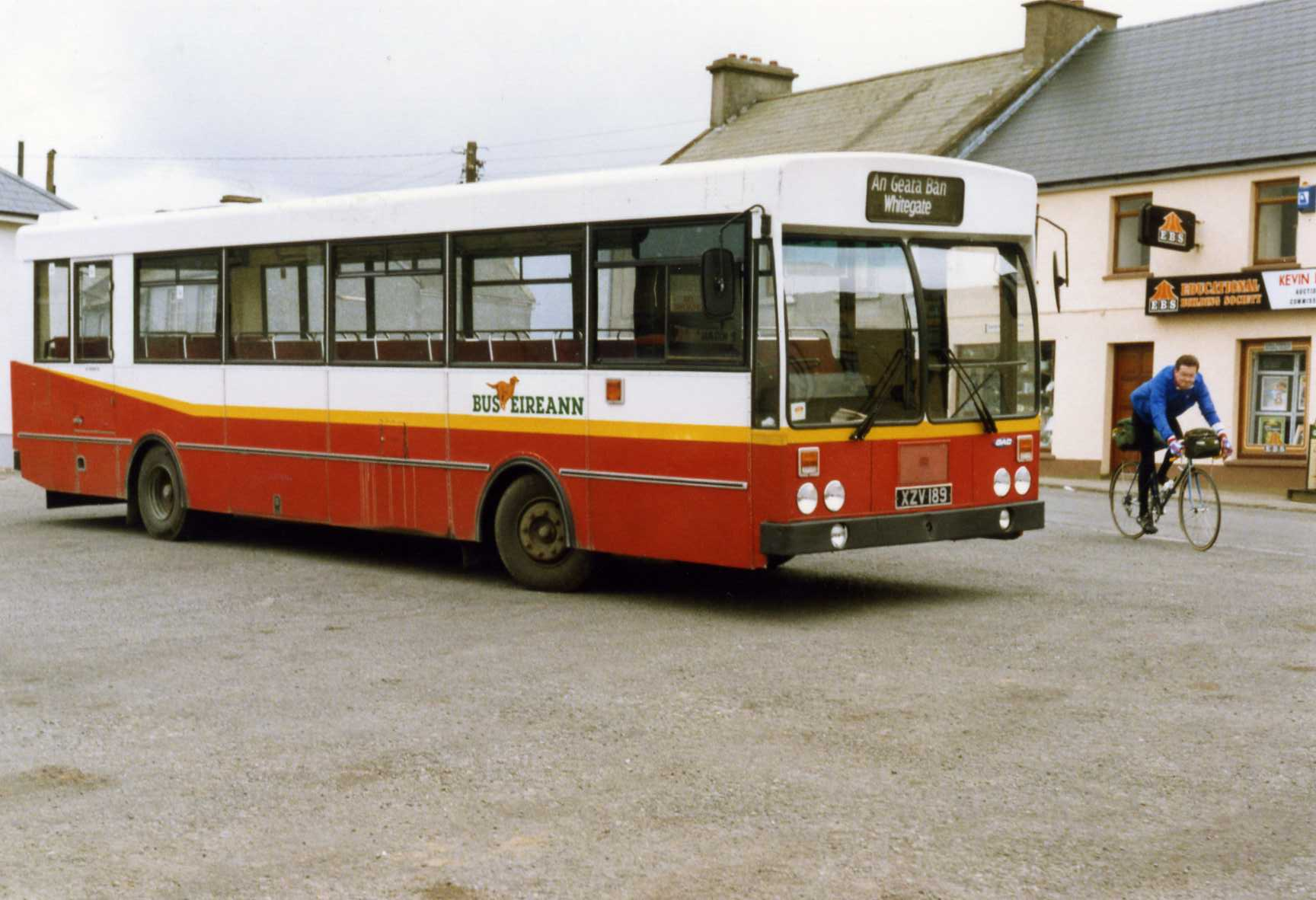
GAC KR189 in Scarriff in April 1989

Production of KR-class rural buses began in Shannon in 1985. These were the last passenger buses to be built in Ireland. A total of 226 KRs were produced, the last of which were completed by CIÉ themselves after GAC folded in 1986.

Unlike the KE, KD and KC classes, the DAF-powered KR employed chassis construction, which proved to be more durable than the integral body by quite a margin. 2007 saw the last KRs withdrawn after more than twenty years in service. No KR class has been preserved yet, although survivors do exist in a number of Bus Éireann depots.

One was evaluated by English operator United Automobile Services in 1986.

== Star coach ==
In 1984, three-axle MAN coaches were built at GAC's plant for Star Coach Corporation in the United States.
