= Westinghouse Air Brake Company General Office Building =

- U.S. National Register of Historic Places
- Pittsburgh Landmark – PHLF
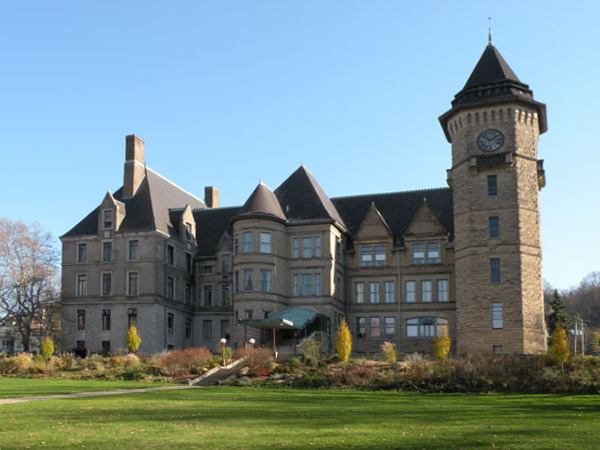
- The building as it appeared in 2009, with the "Executive Wing" on the left.

- Location within Pennsylvania Location within the United States
- Location: Marguerite and Bluff Sts., Wilmerding, Pennsylvania
- Coordinates: 40°23′31″N 79°48′27″W
- Area: 2 acres (0.81 ha)
- Built: 1890
- Architect: Osterling, Frederick J.; Janssen & Cocken
- Architectural style: Renaissance, Romanesque, Chateauesque
- NRHP reference No.: 87000376

Significant dates
- Added to NRHP: March 06, 1987
- Designated PHLF: 1975

The Westinghouse Air Brake Company General Office Building (known locally as the Castle or Library Hall) in Wilmerding, Pennsylvania is a building from 1890. It was listed on the Pittsburgh History and Landmarks Foundation in 1975, National Register of Historic Places in 1987. Originally built as an office building for the Westinghouse Air Brake Company, it housed the George Westinghouse Museum from 2006 to 2016. In 2016 it was sold to the Priory Hospitality Group with the intention of being developed into a boutique hotel. However, the 2020 global pandemic affected those plans and it was announced in November 2021 that the building will be used for an art academy and to house classrooms for the Westinghouse Arts Academy, a nearby high school.

== Construction ==
Constructed by architect Frederick J. Osterling, the building has a four-sided clock tower, which was operated by a system of chains and pulleys. Additional designs and remodeling were done by Janssen & Cocken in 1927, which added the "Executive Wing", containing executive offices as well as conference and dining rooms.

The architectural style is a mix of Renaissance Revival and Romanesque. It was destroyed by a fire on 8 April 1896; the foundation, being made of brick, stone, and cement survived, however, and the structure was rebuilt upon the same foundation. It was during this reconstruction that the clock tower was added. At the time, the entire first floor was designed for employees' use, with accommodations such as a library, fully equipped gymnasium, restaurant, swimming pool, and bowling alleys. This brought the total area inside the building to 55,000 square feet (5,100 m^{2}).

The building also housed a boiler house and light station, that supplied both steam and power to the plant, as well as various businesses in the community, such as the Wilmerding YMCA.

== Business history ==
This building contained the offices of the Westinghouse Air Brake Company for well over a century. The company was originally established by George Westinghouse in 1869. Westinghouse had developed many companies during this time of industrial growth at the beginning of the twentieth century. The Air Brake plant, that made for improved performance and increased speed on the nations railways, was moved to its new location in Wilmerding, Pennsylvania in 1889. Wilmerding is a small town about 14 miles (23 km) outside of Pittsburgh which, at the time, was only inhabited by about 5,000 people. Socialism was strong in Wilmerding and it was a peaceful non-violent farming borough. It was thought to be “The Ideal Town” for the company because of its location right along the Pennsylvania Railroad and its mainly blue collar inhabitants. The Air Brake Company employed 3,000 citizens from the surrounding Pittsburgh area, but its work force was composed almost entirely of individuals from Wilmerding.

The office buildings were used until the building was vacated in 1985. It was then donated to the American Production and Inventory Control Society. The Westinghouse Air Brake Company merged with MotivePower in 1999 to form Wabtec (NYSE: WAB). Wabtec still provides employment for more than 1,000 residents of the borough.

== Effect on the community ==
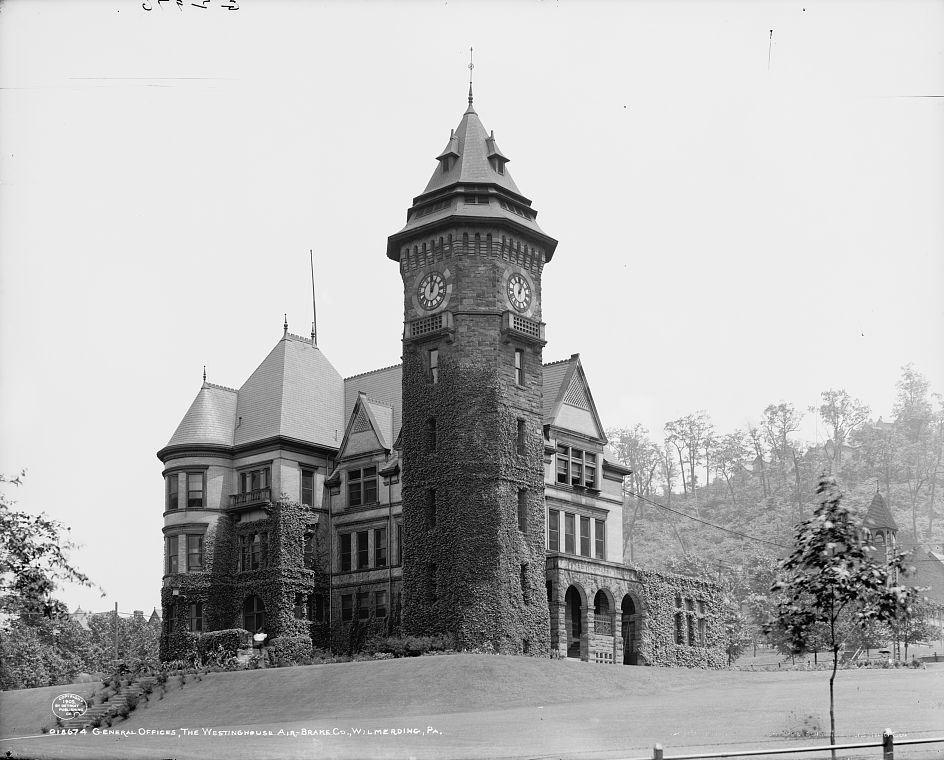
The building from a different angle, as it appeared circa 1905. Shown here before the addition of the "Executive Wing".

When the Westinghouse Plant was also moved to Wilmerding, housing for the employees became hard to come by. In response to this, the Westinghouse Air Brake Home Building Company was formed in 1919 with $1,000,000 USD as startup capital. The 400 houses and large amounts of vacant land that were previously owned by the Westinghouse Air Brake Company were transferred to the new company. The new homes were specifically built with different variations to avoid the lack of variety commonly seen in industrial housing at the time. The Westinghouse Air Brake Home Building Company was so successful that within ten years, there were no vacant lots left on the southern side of Turtle Creek. The extensive town-building, employment, and prosperity that George Westinghouse brought to Wilmerding is still celebrated today in the community, with a festival called "George Westinghouse Days", which takes place in early June each year.

== Inside The Castle ==
The building used to house The George Westinghouse Museum, a model train display, and a Depression glass room. In 2007, the artifacts that were in the Castle museum went to join the Heinz History Center. Since 2007, the Westinghouse Castle has gathered a collection of Westinghouse products and are now on display in their Westinghouse Museum room. The Westinghouse Castle was owned and operated from 2006 to 2016 by a non-profit organization, Wilmerding Renewed. Wilmerding Renewed rented out the property and provided tours of the building, but were not able to generate enough revenue to offset the high operating and maintenance costs.

In June 2016, the property was purchased by John Graf and the Priory Hospitality Group for $100,000 for development into a boutique hotel. The property again changed hands in September 2021 when it was purchased by Westinghouse Castle LP for $86,000.
