= Spa Road Works =

Irish transport construction company

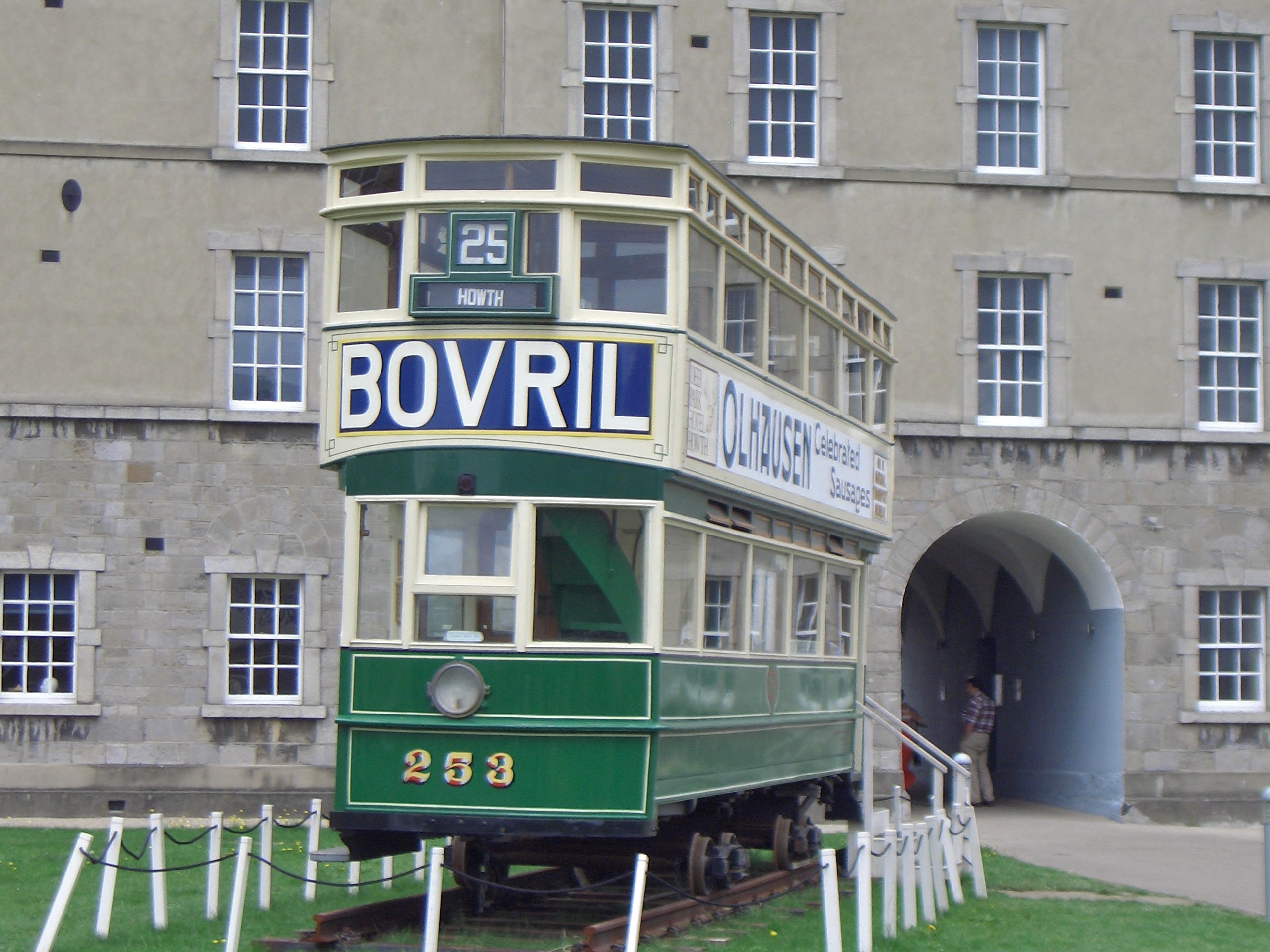
- Dublin tram 253 built at Spa Road in 1928
- Built: 1882
- Location: Inchicore, Dublin, Ireland
- Industry: Engineering
- Products: Trams, Buses
- Defunct: 1977

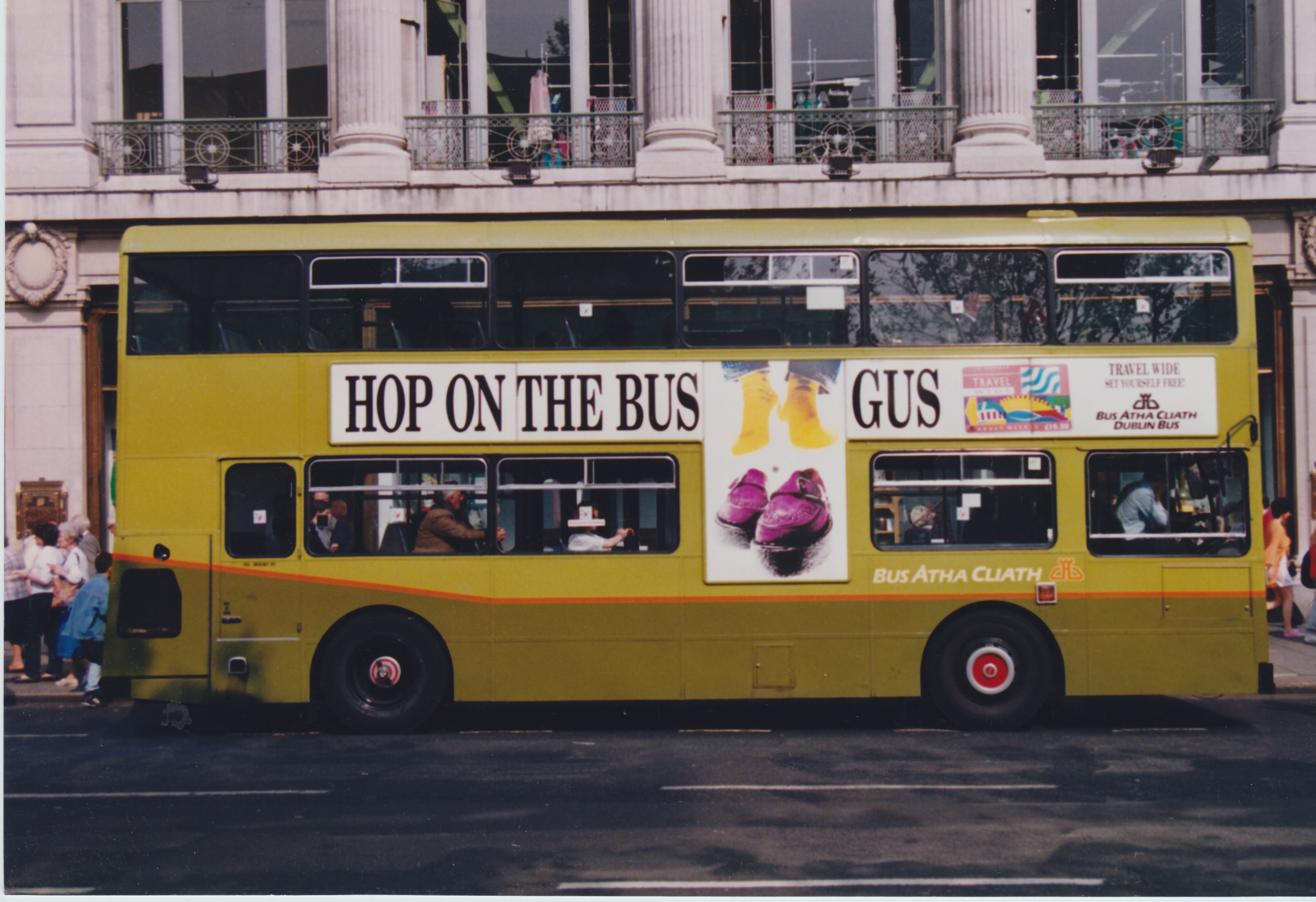
DF840 - the last bus to be built at Spa Road before closure in 1977

Spa Road Works at Inchicore was the major constructor of trams and buses for Ireland during its years of operation from 1882 to 1977.

== History ==
The Spa Road Works were founded by William Martin Murphy, founder of the Dublin United Transport Company (DUTC), in 1882 to construct trams. In 1905 the works became the sole supplier of trams for the Dublin tramways. As the twentieth century progressed the omnibus began to take over from tramways in Dublin, and Spa Road Works migrated into bus production.

The factory moved from DUTC to CIÉ ownership in 1945. Buses continued to be built on Leyland chassis until problems arose in the 1970s. From about 1973 CIÉ leased the factory to Van Hool McArdle, a joint venture of Van Hool and Thomas McArdle of Dundalk, who initially continued to build Leyland Atlanteans.

Following closure in 1977 tools and equipment were moved to the Bombardier-GAC factory set up in Shannon which produced buses from 1980 until 1986.

== Output ==
=== Trams ===
The trams built as the works for Dublin were noted for being among the finest running trams anywhere with designs distinctive to Dublin.

=== Buses ===
- Spa Road constructed over 800 Leyland Titans between the 1930s and 1961.
- Leyland Atlantean, 602 of these rear engined buses were constructed at Dublin and replaced front-engined rear loading buses throughout the capital.
