= Henry Ford & Son Ltd. =

Irish subsidiary of Ford Motor Company

Ford Ireland
- Formerly: Henry Ford & Son Ltd.
- Type: Subsidiary
- Industry: Automotive
- Founded: 17 April 1917; 109 years ago
- Founder: Henry Ford
- Headquarters: Cork, County Cork, Ireland
- Key people: Lisa Brankin (managing director)
- Products: Automobiles, pickups, vans
- Parent: Ford of Europe
- Website: ford.ie

Henry Ford & Son Limited (commonly referred to as Ford Ireland) is the Irish subsidiary of the United States–based automaker Ford Motor Company. It formerly operated an assembly plant for motor vehicles and was part of the automotive industry in Ireland.

== Company history ==
=== Pre-War ===
Henry Ford founded the company in Cork in Ireland, then part of the U.K., on 17 April 1917. This was the first factory Ford had purposely built outside of America anywhere in the world. He decided to build his first factory abroad in Cork because Ballinascarty, County Cork, was home to the Ford family for more than two centuries, before their emigration to America in 1832. Work on building the plant took two years.

The first tractor rolled off the production line on 3 July 1919. The factory was used to build tractors initially. In July 1919, it started production and turned its tractor brand into Fordson, and made 303 tractors in 1919. In 1920, there were 3,626 tractors built and the sum of £327,000 was also spent on a machine shop, foundry expansion, new wharves and equipment for the plant. The sale of the Fordsons was primarily in Ireland and Britain. Large numbers were also shipped to Bordeaux, Cadiz, Copenhagen, Romania and the near east. The original goal was to build 20,000 Fordson tractors a year.

Edward Grace, managing director of Henry Ford & Son, realised it was uneconomical for Cork to rely solely on Fordson to survive, as it was more costly for distributors of Fordson tractors to buy stock in Cork than it would be if they were to buy in Dearborn Michigan. He also saw that Manchester needed extra production facilities for Model T cars. Cork had a machine shop and foundry that were not being used to their full capacity. In 1920, Since Ireland was still part of the United Kingdom at the time, there were no customs duties. This is how the production of parts for Ford of Britain started in the Cork plant, and by August 1920 Cork started producing all Manchester's cast-iron requirements for the Model-T, including the engine. but by the end of 1920, tractor output from Cork fell to 1,433. In February 1922, Cork Corporation ordered the company to comply with the terms of the lease or face expulsion (The 1918 Corporation lease of the land had specified that Fords provide work for 2,000 Cork workers.) The directors of Henry Ford & Son opposed the rationale claiming that the economic and political climate had changed radically within three years of the company setting up in Cork. Cork Corporation backed down from their requests. During the rest of 1922, the Cork company narrowed its tractor operation by clearing its stocks and building another 2,233 Fordsons.

After the Irish Free State was founded on 6 December 1922, the British government announced that from 1 April 1923 customs would be charged for deliveries from Ireland. This made deliveries uneconomical. So after the 7,605th Cork-built tractor came off the line, Tractor production ended on December 29, 1922. Edward Grace assembled all the equipment used in tractor manufacture and shipped everything to Dearborn, Michigan.

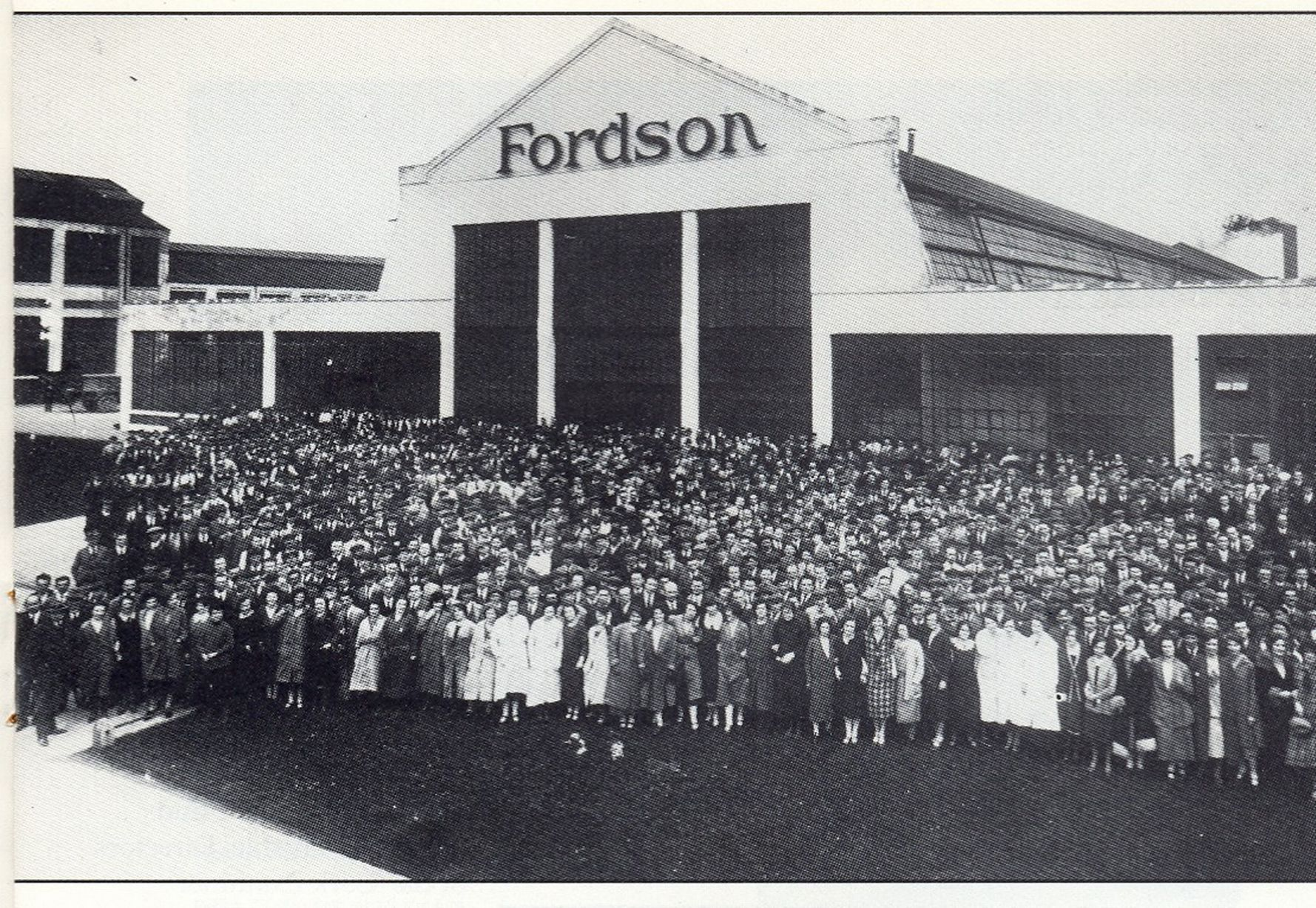
The staff of the Cork Plant gathered outside the factory in 1926

Since Ford of Britain was building a large new plant in Dagenham, the Cork plant started to build engines and rear axles for the Ford Model T, and these were delivered to England. Other Ford plants in Europe were also supplied. Ford France and Ford Germany came into question from 1925. This continued until production of the Model-T in Europe ended in 1927.

Had Grace not seen that tractor production was not financially viable, the plant at Cork may not have started making cars. By the time the Ford Model T was discontinued in December 1927, over 10,000 units were made in Ireland. Moreover, trucks emerged. From 1928, Ford Model A were delivered to Ireland from England and were equipped with engines in Cork. The standard engine was disadvantaged due to its displacement and RAC Horsepower rating. The company, therefore, developed a smaller engine, which was rated at 14.9 HP instead of 24 HP, and also supplied these engines to other Ford plants in Europe and Japan.

On 1 April 1929, the production of tractors started again. It was the only Ford tractor factory in the world at the time. However, due to the economic crisis of 1932 and renewed customs duties caused tractor production to be moved to Dagenham. From then on, the Cork Plant was solely an assembly plant.

During the war, the plant in Cork was closed, and some of the workers form the Cork plant went over to the Dagenham plant in Essex. After the interruption in assembly, vehicle production was continued in February 1946.

=== Post-War ===
From 1946, Ford had around one-third of the car market in total and an even higher share of the commercial vehicle figure. From the 1950s, Ford consistently captured 25–35 % of the Irish car market and between 35 and 40 % of the commercial vehicle market. Taking passenger and commercial vehicles together, it had the highest market share of any Ford company in the world.

When the Cork plant came to celebrate its 50th anniversary in 1967, it was a working celebration since the late '50s. Tom Brennan, who had taken over as managing director from John O'Neill in 1959, had persuaded Ford's European Management to invest IR£2m in Cork. He believed this was necessary in order to bring car production up to the very highest standards prevailing in Europe. The man that Tom Brennan chose to implement the expansion was a fellow Corkman, Paddy Hayes, who, some years later, was to succeed him as managing director of Ford of Ireland.

The IR£2m was spent on re-building, re-equipping and modernising the assembly plant, which became the largest factory of its kind. 500,000 pounds was invested in an ultra-modern body-finishing department, with Europe's largest 'slipper-dip' immersion under-coating tank guaranteeing a high-quality base for final paint coatings.

The remainder of the assembly plant was completely re-organised, re-equipped and re-housed in new light-alloy, unitary construction buildings covering an area of over 117,000 square feet. This meant two separate final-assembly lines, one for heavy commercial vehicles and the second and major unit for passenger and light commercial vehicles.

Incorporated in the new facilities was a parts-and-accessories building holding millions of parts, representing a stock of over 23,000 separate items. The factory extensions virtually reversed the plant orientation since the previous wharf-side entrance was closed and all traffic now entered by Centre Park Road - known locally as Ford's Road.

The official opening ceremony of the new buildings took place on 11 October 1967. The Taoiseach Jack Lynch headed the 350 guests at the Marina Plant in the morning and there he cut a tape to symbolise the opening of the modern plant. The plant was blessed by Bishop Lucey. Jack Lynch made a speech while opening the plant in which he said: "For 50 years, the Ford Company has been part of the industrial life of this city but of course, Ford's links with Cork go back much further. The story of Henry Ford, whose father emigrated from Ballinascarty 120 weary years ago, is so well-known that much of it is already folklore. Indeed, the record of his life and achievements looms large in the history of the development of modern industrial methods, many of which he devised and brought to perfection"

The Cork Ford plant turned out the widest range of vehicles under one badge on the Irish market, with some 14 different passenger models and a wide selection of commercials. These included the Cortina, the Escort and the Transit van as well as the Ford D Series Truck. The total Cork Plant area covered 33 acres and the growth of the factory increased more than 200 per cent in the decade between 1956 and 1966. By 1967, it had about 1,000 employees assembling cars and commercial vehicles for use throughout the Republic.

=== Closure of the plant ===
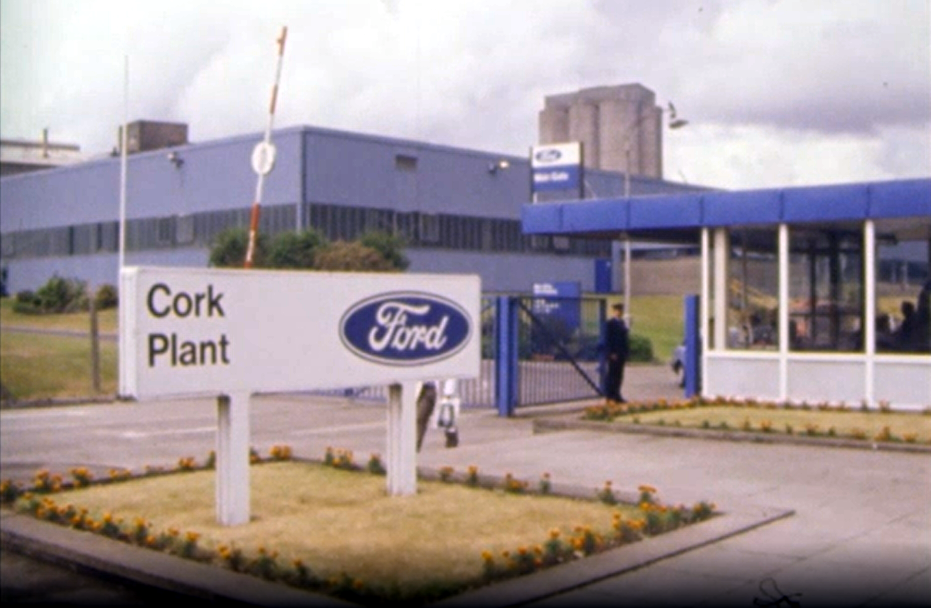
The Main Gate to the Cork Plant on Marquee Road in 1984

When Ireland joined the EEC in 1973, many car assembly plants in Ireland decided to close their doors, including Fiat and British Leyland, as their initial purpose (to avoid import tax imposed on cars imported into Ireland) was going to be avoided as that tax was to be lifted in 1985. Ford, however, stayed for the time being due to the heritage and connection to Cork. But clouds were looming on the horizon for the plant, as most cars made at the Marina plant from then would have been exported to western Europe, and by the 1980s, the plant had losses of IR£10m each year. The plant was finishing 400 cars a week, compared to Ford's Genk plant in Belgium churning out over 6,000 cars a week. The closure of the Dunlop tyre factory beside the Ford Plant, with the loss of 800 jobs, was the start of closures in the Marina. Despite IR£10,000,000 being spent on upgrading the plant in 1982 to assemble the Sierra to try and save it, on 17 January 1984, Ford of Europe announced that the plant in Cork would close the plant on the basis that size and location made it no longer financially viable. and on the 13 July 1984, after nearly 70 years in operation in the Marina in Cork, the first purpose-built Ford Motor Company Plant outside of America closed for the final time, bringing with it the loss of 800 jobs. Henry Ford & Sons later became the sales division for Ford Ireland.

== Henry Ford & Son Ltd. today and the Legacy of Ford in Ireland ==
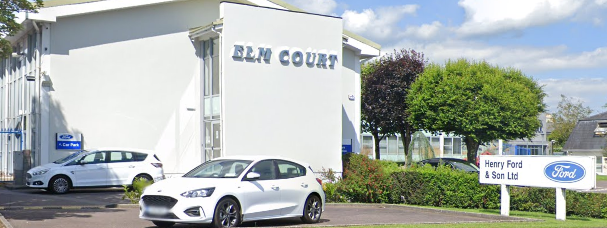
Henry Ford & Son in Elm Court on Boreenmanna Road in Cork City

When the Henry Ford & Son plant closed in 1984, it left a long-standing legacy behind it across the island of Ireland, having been there for nearly 70 years.

Ford's legacy was evident in the sales figures, as Ford has been the market leader in Ireland for decades before and after the plant closure, given its heritage. Even with this heritage, however, in recent years, it finds itself sitting at 5th place in the sales figures, with big names like the Mondeo and the Focus being purged by SUV's. Ford sits behind the likes of Toyota, Hyundai, Volkswagen and Skoda in sales figures who have held the top four places in the market for a number of years

=== Cork Plant today ===
Since closing the plant, most of the Cork plant has remained intact. Ford held on to most of the plant until well into the Celtic Tiger, selling the 11.2-acre site that was used as a distribution centre for IR£33m. The same site was used as the location for Live at the Marquee in Cork. The site recently sold for €15m to be developed into apartments. Most of the car assembly factory has survived, with most of it turned into businesses, storage and warehousing for local business.

=== Lord Mayor of Cork ===
In 1989, the Lord Mayor was given a brand new 89-C-1 registered Ford Granada as a gift for the new year from Henry Ford & Son, just down the road from the residence of the Mayor, with emphasis on the fact it was the first car registered in the county for that year. The gift of a new Granada was kept up for 4 more years, all of which were the first car registered in Cork that year. The tradition continued with the launch of the Scorpio in 1993 up until 2001 when he received a Mondeo Ghia. The Lord Mayor received a Mondeo each year until 2022.

The media was particularly interested in the car he received in 2013, largely because the government decided to change the registration used on cars to increase car sales, and a few people felt that the number 13 was unlucky. By putting 131 on cars registered between January and July of that year, and 132 for cars registered between July and December of that year, they got around this problem. The Lord Mayor's car was the first car many people saw this registration be used. From 2013 he receives two cars from Ford. The long-standing tradition of Mondeos finished in 2021 with the 212-C-1 registered Mondeo Vignale, as the Mondeo was to be discontinued in April 2022. In January 2022, the lord Mayor received a Ford Mustang Mach-E.

=== Vintage Cars ===
Cars that were made in the Cork plant are rare now and are very collectible. Cars that were specially trimmed in Ireland, like the Cortina Cashel, are extremely rare today compared to models sold in the UK due to their low circulation in the much smaller Irish market.

To mark the end of production of the Cortina, making way for the Sierra, three special edition Cortina models were commissioned in Ireland. They were the Corrib, Cashel & Tara, all based on the English-trimmed Cortina 80s.

The Corrib appears to be the most limited version produced originally, with just 1202 of these made from January to March 17, 1981, and launched to great fanfare by the model Michelle Rocca. The Cashel followed later that same year and the Tara was the final special edition up to the arrival of the Sierra in October 1982, some being registered after the arrival of that car. The Corrib, which was based on the Cortina L had GL seats, fabric door trim, rear centre armrest and colour keyed carpet. The side stripe was a thick one colour matched to the colour of the car and fading out along the doors. Engine options were either 1300 or 1600.

The Cashel, again based on the L had GL seats in ‘York’ fabric, some extra GL fittings, like a centre console, an electric radio Ariel, a key with a light incorporated, and a thin double side stripe. The radiator grille was painted body colour. The engine options were, as before, either 1300 or 1600.

The Tara had the Ghia style seats, a centre console and carpet trimmed lower door cards. The side striping was the same as the equivalent Uk Crusader run out model. It appears the Tara was only available with the 1600 engine. The Tara also had the name ‘Tara’ stamped into the body identification plate of each car.

Each edition had a badge on the rear boot with an Irish stylised script denoting its name.

In relation to survival rates, no Corrib appears to be left roadworthy, although a very rough example appeared for sale in Ireland in 2021. Only a pair of Cashels are known to survive (ESI313 & MIM168) and a few more Tara's are left, 4657DI & 350TZU being two of these but all editions are very much in the single figures now.

Alongside the Cortina the run out Escort in 1981 was the Elite, which was easily discernible by its heavy two-tone side stripe similar to the UK Linnet equivalent. They came in two versions, Elite DeLuxe or Elite L, in either two- or four-door. All had the 1100 engine, square headlamps and the side stripes. The DeLuxe had Beta cloth seats and the standard steel road wheels, whereas the L had the sports-type wheels and a colour-matched vinyl roof alongside GL full-height door cards, arm rests, grab handles and a centre console.

There are many Classic car clubs associated with Ford in Ireland, keeping these special editions alive, including Cortina Enthusiasts Ireland, and Irish Ford Escort Owners Club.

=== Irish Ford Fair ===
The Irish Ford Fair has been held in Banna in County Kerry since 2018, and has attracted Ford fans, young and old, from around the country. The event is usually held in August.
