= Spa Road =

Road in Gloucester, England

Coordinates: 51.8599°N 2.2481°W

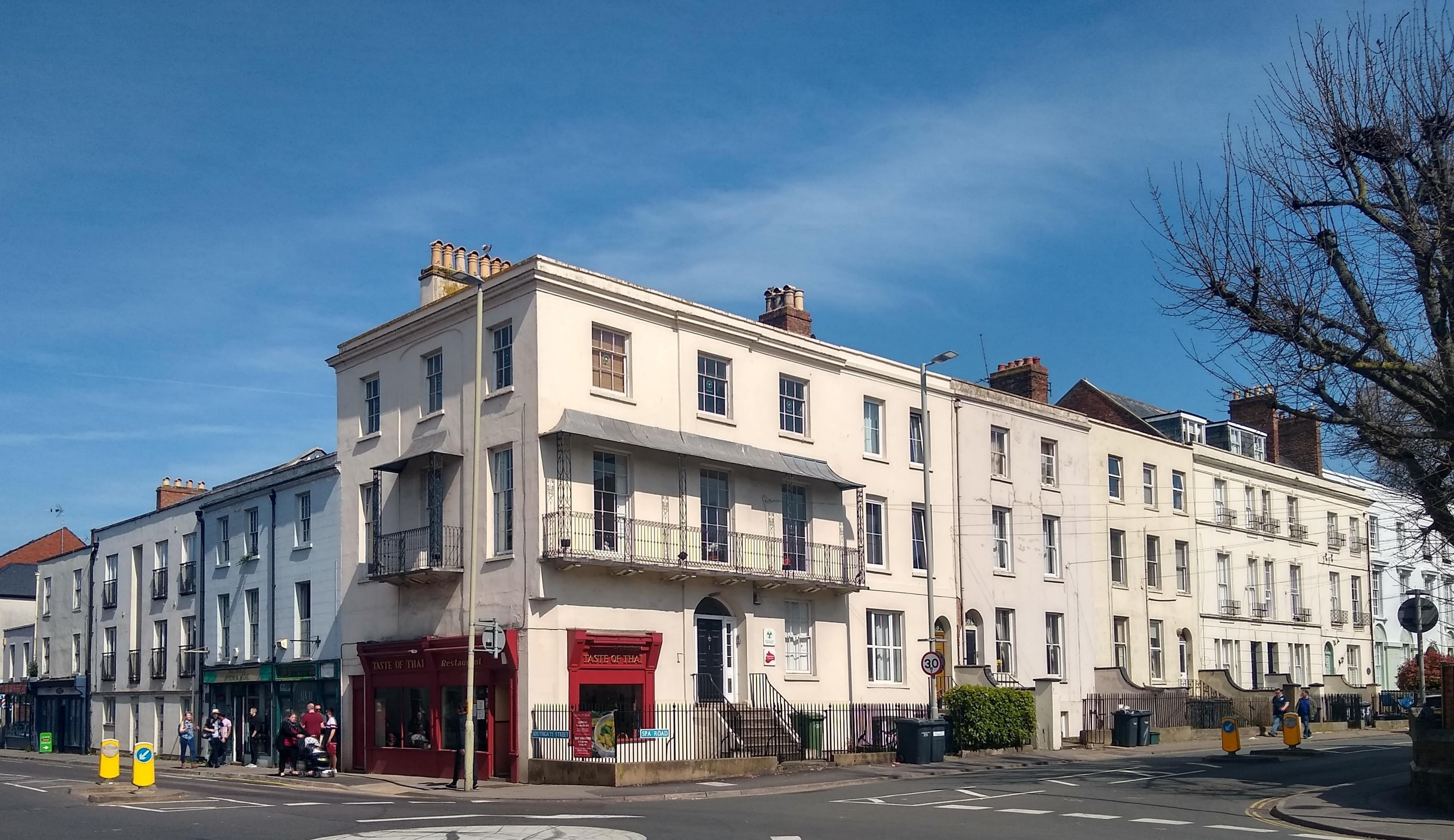
Corner of Southgate Street and Spa Road

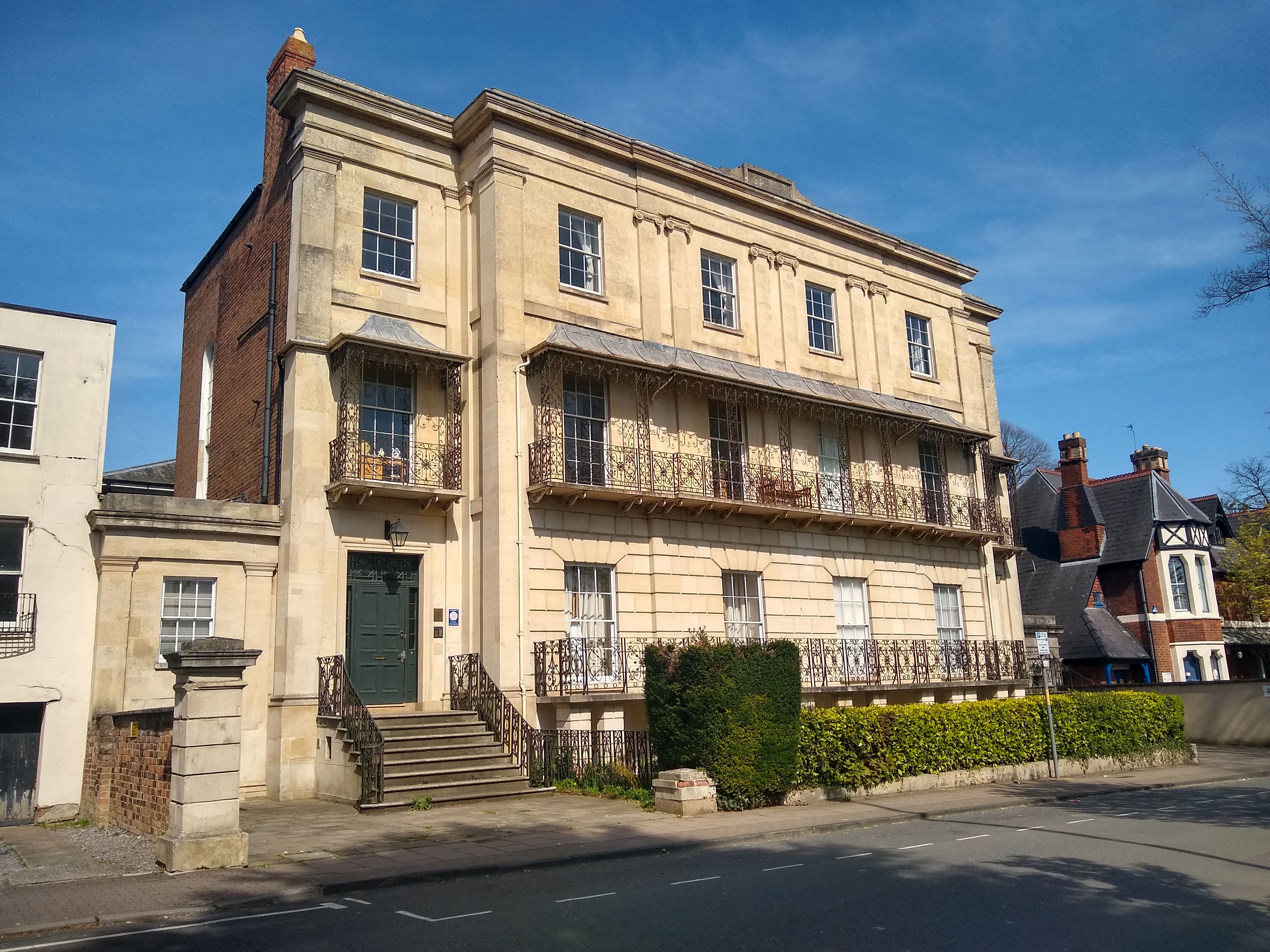
The Judges Lodgings

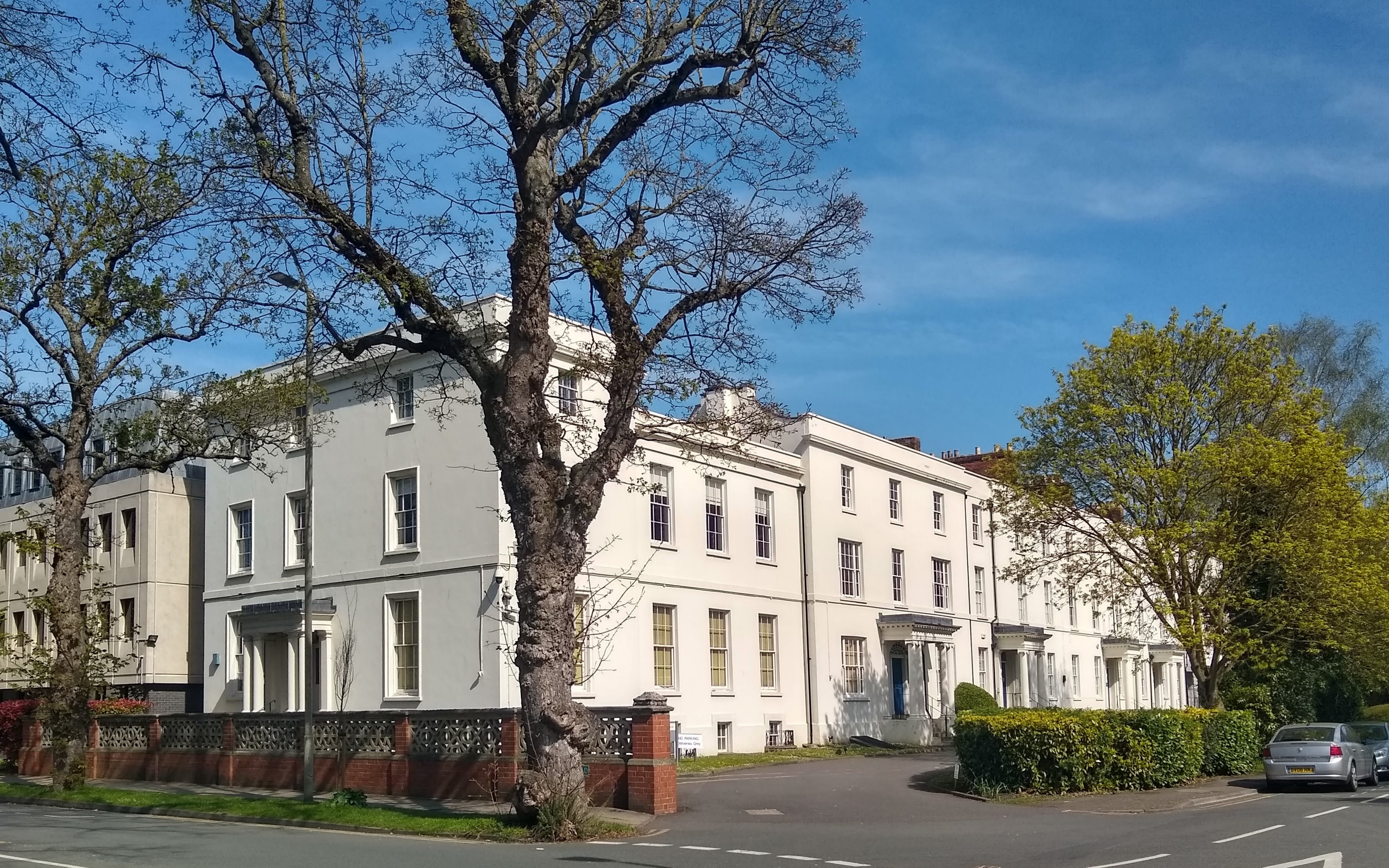
Beaufort Buildings on the corner of Spa Road and Brunswick Road

Spa Road in the City of Gloucester runs between the junction of Southgate Street and Llanthony Road in the north and Montpellier in the South. It is joined by Brunswick Road on its north side. It contains a number of listed buildings.

== Listed buildings ==
- 117 and 119 Southgate Street (corner of Spa Road)
- 2
- 3-7
- 9 and 11
- 11a
- Norfolk House
- Ribston Hall
- Maitland House
- 19 & 21
- Sherborne House
- Judges Lodgings
- Beaufort House (corner of Brunswick Road and Spa Road)
- 1 Beaufort Buildings
- 2, 3, 4 Beaufort Buildings
- 5 & 6 Beaufort Buildings
- 7 Beaufort Buildings
