= Alesbury =

The Alesbury was an Irish automobile. It was powered by an 8/10 hp Stevens-Duryea engine and had solid tires. The car was exhibited in Dublin in 1907, and manufacture lasted from then until 1908.
