= Ralph H. Kress =

Ralph H. Kress (July 10, 1904 – June 28, 1995) was an engineer who has been credited with designing off-road mining trucks. He was inducted into the National Mining Hall of Fame, who referred to him as "The Father Of The Off-Highway Truck", in 2001.

Kress attended night school at the Massachusetts Institute of Technology from 1933 through 1939, receiving an engineering degree. After working for General Motors, he was commissioned in the Transportation Corps in March 1943, and later received the Legion of Merit.

In 1950, he became general manager of Dart Truck Company. By being first to use exclusively power steering on a truck, he created larger trucks, such as the Dart 75-TA. He joined Wabco (Haulpak) in 1955, and Caterpillar Inc. in 1962, retiring in 1969. He then joined Kress Corporation, his son's company, and developed further trucks, including one with 90-degree steering capability.
