= Wilmerding, Pennsylvania =

Borough in Pennsylvania, US

- Borough
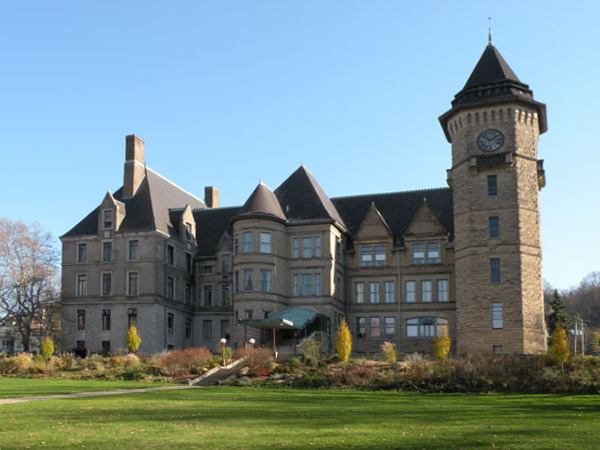
- Westinghouse Air Brake Company General Office Building in Wilmerding, built in 1890

- Location in Allegheny County and the U.S. state of Pennsylvania.

- Location of Pennsylvania in the United States
- Coordinates: 40°23′40″N 79°48′31″W
- Country: United States
- State: Pennsylvania
- County: Allegheny

Area
  - Total: 0.43 sq mi (1.11 km^{2})
  - Land: 0.43 sq mi (1.11 km^{2})
  - Water: 0 sq mi (0.00 km^{2})

Population (2020)
  - Total: 1,781
  - Estimate (2019): 2,111
  - Density: 4,923.5/sq mi (1,900.96/km^{2})
- Demonym: Wilmerdinger
- Time zone: UTC-5 (EST)
  - Summer (DST): UTC-4 (EDT)
- ZIP code: 15148
- Area code: 412
- FIPS code: 42-85496
- Website: www.wilmerdingboro.com

Wilmerding is a borough in Allegheny County, Pennsylvania, United States. The population was 1,781 at the 2020 census. It is located 12 miles (19 km) southeast of Pittsburgh. At the start of the twentieth century, it had extensive foundries and machine shops of the Westinghouse Air Brake Company. Wilmerding is adjacent to the borough of Turtle Creek, which takes its name from a small stream that flows past both places.

== History ==
George Westinghouse purchased land in the Turtle Creek valley in 1887 and 1888 as a site for his Westinghouse Air Brake Company and related facilities. Westinghouse then sold the land to the East Pittsburgh Improvement Company, incorporated in December 1888, to develop the site, and it began the sale of lots in June 1889.

Wilmerding's most notable historic structure is the Westinghouse Air Brake Company General Office Building (1889–1890, rebuilt 1896), designed by Frederick J. Osterling and now listed on the National Register of Historic Places.

The community was named for Joanna Wilmerding (Bruce) Negley, wife of William B. Negley, who in turn was a local landowner and nephew of Thomas Mellon.

Wilmerding officially became a borough on March 8, 1890. The first burgess (mayor) was T. W. Walsh, elected on June 14, 1890.

== Geography ==
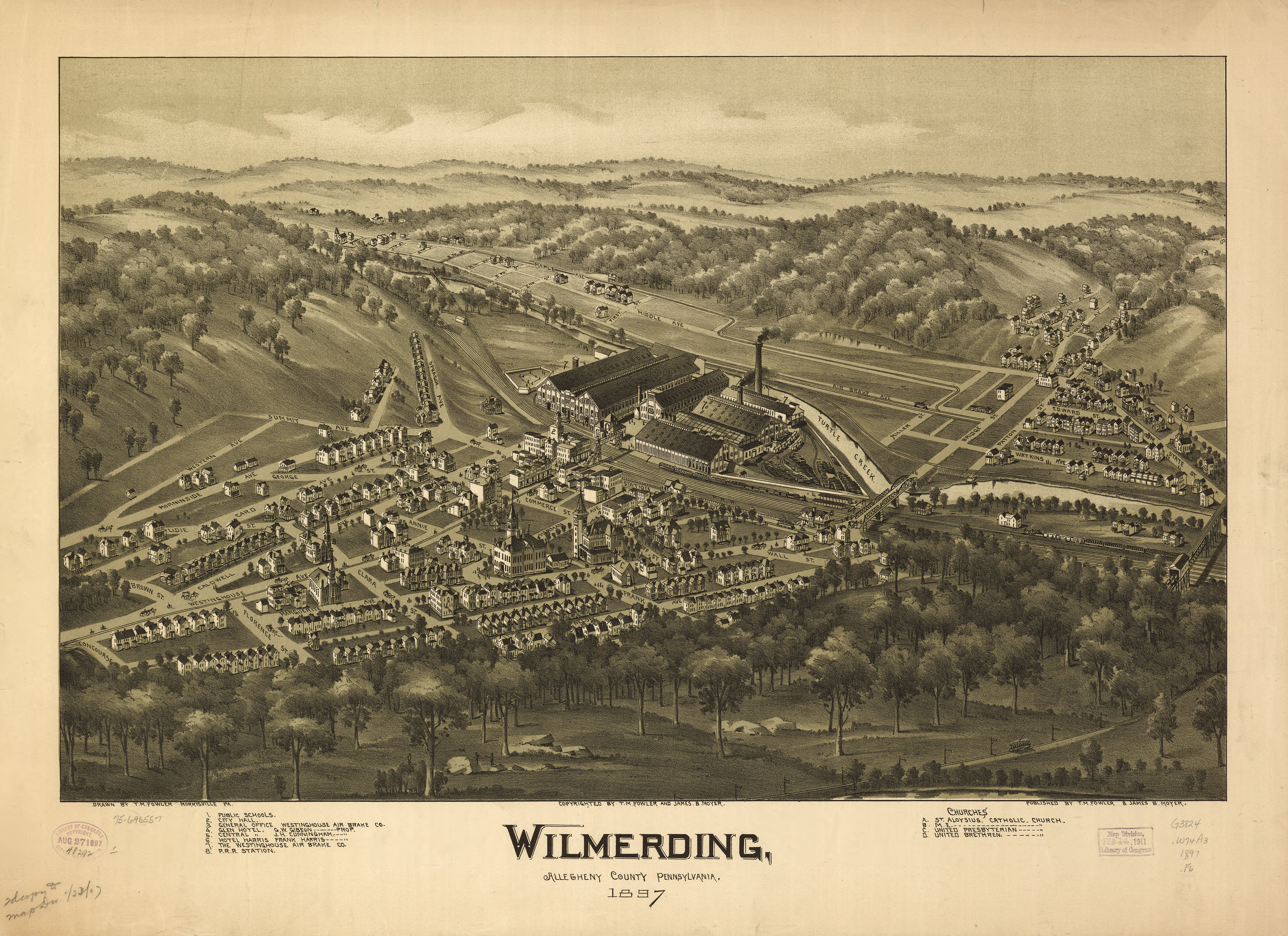
Bird's-eye view of Wilmerding in 1897 by T. M. Fowler

Wilmerding is located at 40°23′40″N 79°48′31″W (40.394538, −79.808576).

According to the United States Census Bureau, the borough has a total area of 0.4 square miles (1.0 km^{2}), all land.

== Surrounding communities ==
Wilmerding neighbors five borders, including Monroeville to the northeast, Wall to the east, East McKeesport to the south, North Versailles Township to the southwest, and Turtle Creek (via Greensburg Pike/Lincoln Highway Bridge) to the northwest.

== Demographics ==
Historical population
Census	Pop.	Note	%±
1890	419		—
1900	4,179		897.4%
1910	6,133		46.8%
1920	6,441		5.0%
1930	6,291		−2.3%
1940	5,662		−10.0%
1950	5,325		−6.0%
1960	4,349		−18.3%
1970	3,218		−26.0%
1980	2,421		−24.8%
1990	2,222		−8.2%
2000	2,145		−3.5%
2010	2,190		2.1%
2020	1,781		−18.7%

As of the 2000 census, there were 2,145 people, 1,032 households, and 509 families residing in the borough. The population density was 4,789.7 inhabitants per square mile (1,849.3/km^{2}). There were 1,199 housing units at an average density of 2,677.3 per square mile (1,033.7/km^{2}). The racial makeup of the borough was 91.33% White, 6.34% African American, 0.14% Native American, 0.23% Asian, 0.33% from other races, and 1.63% from two or more races. Hispanic or Latino of any race were 1.26% of the population.

There were 1,032 households, out of which 21.4% had children under the age of 18 living with them, 30.8% were married couples living together, 14.1% had a female householder with no husband present, and 50.6% were non-families. 45.5% of all households were made up of individuals, and 20.6% had someone living alone who was 65 years of age or older. The average household size was 2.05 and the average family size was 2.88.

In the borough the population was spread out, with 20.7% under the age of 18, 8.0% from 18 to 24, 28.8% from 25 to 44, 21.4% from 45 to 64, and 21.0% who were 65 years of age or older. The median age was 40 years. For every 100 females there were 82.9 males. For every 100 females age 18 and over, there were 77.5 males.

The median income for a household in the borough was $24,811, and the median income for a family was $31,667. Males had a median income of $28,125 versus $21,250 for females. The per capita income for the borough was $14,330. About 12.2% of families and 16.6% of the population were below the poverty line, including 17.4% of those under age 18 and 14.7% of those age 65 or over.

== Government and politics ==
Presidential election results
Year	Republican	Democratic	Third parties
2020	33% 229	65% 451	1% 9
2016	32% 236	66% 490	2% 17
2012	30% 215	69% 489	1% 8
