= History of Volkswagen in Ireland =

Involvement of Volkswagen in Ireland since 1949

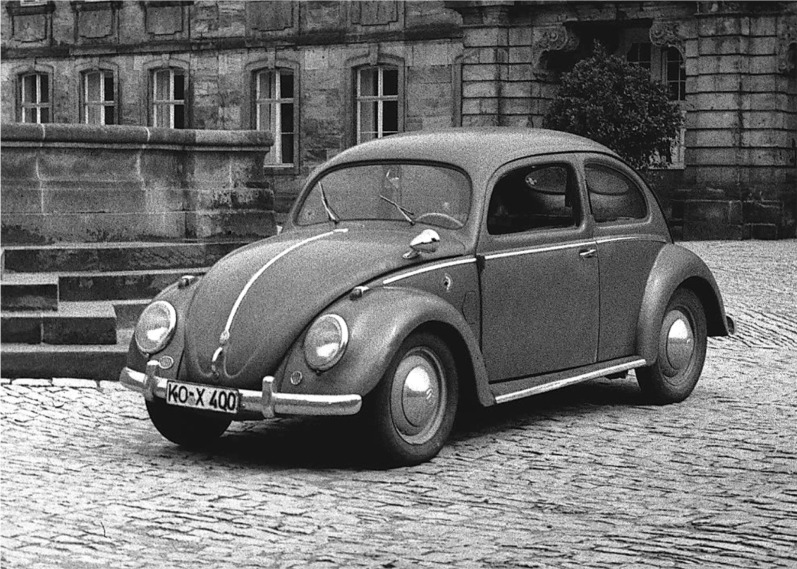
A Type 1 similar to the vehicles first assembled in Ireland.

Volkswagen began its involvement in Ireland when in 1949, Motor Distributors Limited, founded by Stephen O'Flaherty secured the franchise for the country at that year's Paris Motor Show.

== Volkswagen assembly ==
Motor Distributors' began to handle Volkswagen in Ireland in 1950, when Volkswagen Beetles started arriving into Dublin packed in crates in what was termed 'completely knocked down' (CKD) form ready to be assembled. The vehicles were assembled in a former tram depot at 162 Shelbourne Road in Ballsbridge. As of 2021, this is the premises for Ballsbridge Motors who are a Mercedes-Benz dealer. The first Volkswagen ever built outside Germany was assembled here. This vehicle is now on display at the Volkswagen Museum in Wolfsburg. Irish-assembled Beetles rose from an output of 46 units in 1950 to 2,155 units in 1952. This necessitated a move in 1955 to a new factory premises on the Naas Road. Assembly of the Beetle continued there until 1977 when production of the car ceased in Europe. Volkswagen vehicle assembly continued in Dublin until the mid-1980s. During the same period, the Volkswagen Transporter van was also assembled at these premises. This premises remained as the headquarters for Motor Distributors Ltd.

== Volkswagen sales ==
Between 1950 and 1980, Beetle sales in Ireland averaged at 3,000 - 4,000 units per annum peaking in 1972 when 5,288 units were sold. In 1953, O'Flaherty acquired the Volkswagen franchise for the United Kingdom, which he sold to the Thomas Tilling group in 1957. In 1956, Volkswagen sales were high enough to cause concern in Dáil Éireann that it was adversely affecting the balance of payments. The Volkswagen Golf Mk1 was introduced in 1975 and the Beetle ceased to be sold in 1980.

== Addition of other Volkswagen Group brands ==
The rights to distribute the Audi brand were acquired in 1967 and the rights for Skoda acquired in 1993.

== Transfer back to manufacturer control ==
In 2007, it was announced that Volkswagen AG would take direct control over its operations in Ireland from October 2008. This took effect on 10 October 2008 when the distribution business became Volkswagen Group Ireland. This came about as result of the lifting of block exemption regulations in 2003. Headquarter were moved from its premises on the Naas Road to Liffey Valley.

In November 2009, Volkswagen Group Ireland also took control of the distribution business of SEAT in Ireland, another Volkswagen Group Brand.
