= Shamrock (car) =

Rare car produced in Ireland

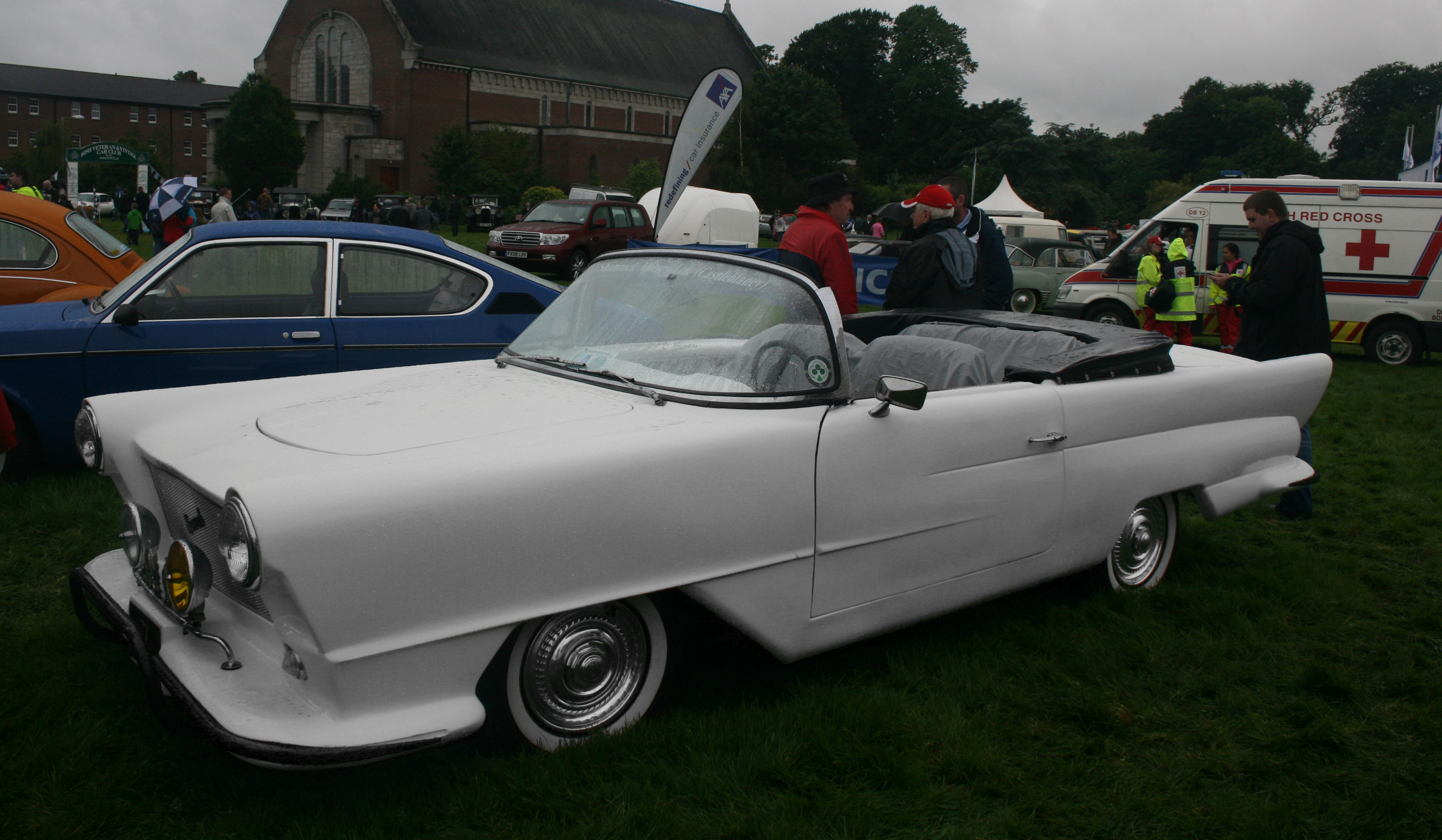
A Shamrock car

The Shamrock is a car that was produced in Ireland for a brief period during the late 1950s.

The business was established by American businessmen James F. Conway and William K Curtis in Castleblaney, Co. Monaghan. The aim was to produce a large luxury car model for export to the US market. Alvin 'Spike' Rhiando, a Canadian ex 500-cc Formula 3 racer, designed the Shamrock.

In 1959, two prototypes were built in Guildford UK and shipped to the US for publicity and marketing purposes. Shortly after production began in Castleblaney however, design flaws became apparent. Although the car was big and heavy, it used a relatively small Austin A55 1.5 litre engine, which limited performance. The A55 also provided the transmission and suspension. Another problem was that the rear wheels were shrouded by body panels and a rear wheel could not be removed (for puncture repair for example) without dropping its axle. The car used fibreglass body panels and was styled as a four seat, two door coupé with removable hardtop. The wheelbase was 98 inches (2487 mm). All cars were painted white, although one in the USA has been repainted candy green.

Production of up to 10,000 cars a year was discussed but as few as ten complete cars were produced during the six months before production ceased. After the factory closed, the unused parts were dumped into the local lake, Lough Muckno.

The car is now very rare, and only nine are believed to still exist: five in Ireland—one each in Killarney, Castleblayney, and Wexford, two in Drogheda, and one in Carlow—and four in the USA, one in Seattle, one in Virginia and two in California.
