= Van Hool McArdle =

Irish bus builder

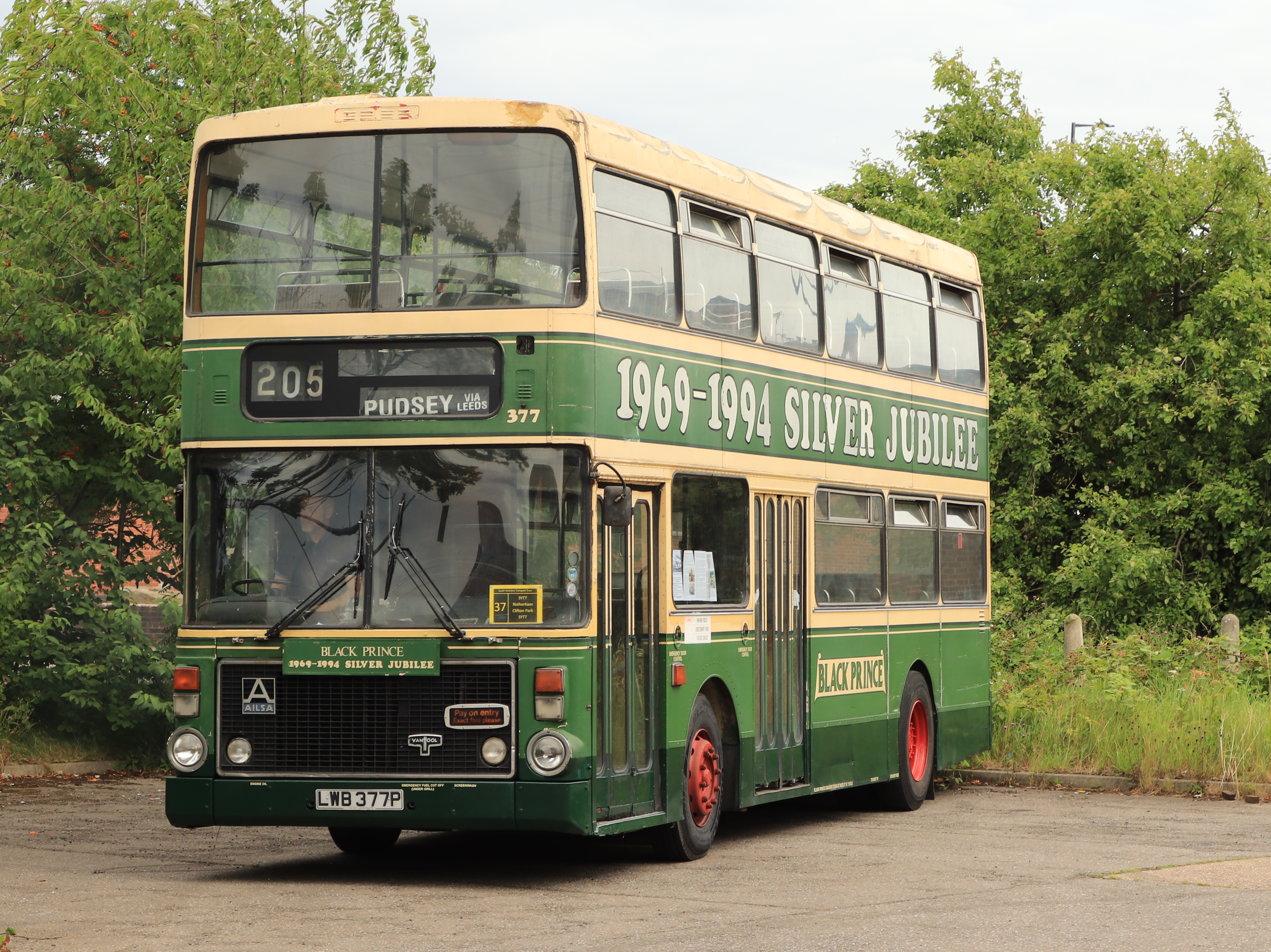
- A Van Hool McArdle bodied Volvo Ailsa B55
- Founded: 1972; 53 years ago
- Defunct: 1978

Van Hool McArdle was an Irish bus builder which operated between 1972 and 1978. It was formed as a joint venture of the Belgian bus builder Van Hool and Irish coachbuilder Thomas McArdle of Dundalk to take over the bus building activities of CIÉ, principally the factory at Spa Road, Dublin. The closure of Van Hool McArdle in 1978 left the Republic of Ireland without a bus manufacturer for several years until the creation of Shannon-based GAC Ireland.

Van Hool McArdle mainly built buses and coaches for CIÉ, with 268 built between 1973 and 1976. Additionally, some were exported to the UK, including double decker Volvo Ailsa B55s for the South Yorkshire Passenger Transport Executive.
