= Westinghouse Air Brake Company =

Former American manufacturing company

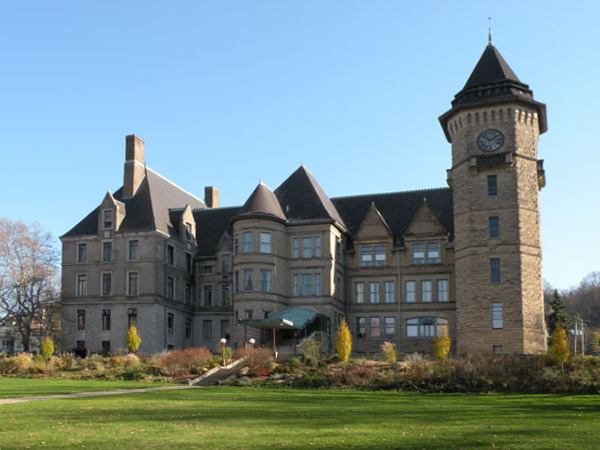
- The Westinghouse Building in Wilmerding, Pennsylvania, pictured in 2009
- Type: Public
- Traded as: NYSE: WAB
- Industry: Transport
- Founded: September 1869
- Founder: George Westinghouse
- Defunct: 1999; 27 years ago
- Fate: Merged with MotivePower to form Wabtec in 1999
- Successor: Wabtec
- Headquarters: Westinghouse Building, Wilmerding, U.S.
- Area served: Worldwide
- Products: Railway air brakes
- Parent: American Standard (1968–99)

The Westinghouse Air Brake Company (WABCO) was an American company founded on September 28, 1869, by George Westinghouse in Pittsburgh, Pennsylvania. Earlier in the year he had invented the railway air brake in New York state.

After having manufactured equipment in Pittsburgh for a number of years, he began to construct facilities and plants east of the city where homes for his employees were built. In 1889, the air brake manufacturing facility was moved to Wilmerding, Pennsylvania, and the company's general office building was built there in 1890. The general office building is now listed on the National Register of Historic Places.

In 1921 the company began manufacturing a modified air brake system for installation in trucks and heavy vehicles.

In 1953 WABCO entered the heavy equipment marketplace, buying the assets of leading equipment designer R.G LeTourneau. An entity known as "LeTourneau-Westinghouse" sold a range of innovative products, including scrapers, cranes and bulldozers until 1967, when it shortened its name to "Wabco". In 1968 American Standard purchased Wabco.

WABCO's direct successor companies include WABCO Vehicle Control Systems, a commercial vehicle air brake manufacturer now owned by ZF Friedrichshafen; and Wabtec, a railway equipment manufacturer, which have been owned and operated independently of each other since the mid-twentieth century.

== History ==
The Westinghouse Air Brake Company was established by George Westinghouse in 1869. In 1889, the Air Brake plant was moved to Wilmerding, Pennsylvania, a small farming town located 14 miles (23 km) outside of Pittsburgh. At the time, was only inhabited by about 5,000 people. Socialism was strong in Wilmerding, and it was thought to be "The Ideal Town" for the company because of its location immediately adjacent to the Pennsylvania Railroad and its mainly blue-collar inhabitants. In the 1890s, the Air Brake Company employed 3,000 citizens from the surrounding Pittsburgh area, but the bulk of its workforce consisted of employees who lived in the vicinity of Wilmerding.

Wilmerding developed rapidly around this new and growing company, and the town soon became known for this industry. A little under one third of its population was somehow related, and more often than not one would end up raising their children in the same home that they were raised in. Local business prospered as well. Many of the passengers that were departing from or coming into Wilmerding stopped to shop at these stores along the narrow sidewalk before heading home.

Working conditions at the Westinghouse Air Brake Company (WA&B) were more than adequate, and the company instituted new policies for its employees. For example, in 1869, it was one of the first companies to institute a 9-hour work day and a 55-hour work week, at a time when typical working days spanned between 10 and 12 hours (and sometimes more), and where a 60-hour work week was only considered moderate. WA&B also got the reputation for being the first industry in America to adopt half holidays on Saturday afternoons. Various benefit options were also instituted in order to improve the working and living conditions of the firm's employees.

The Air Brake plant prospered, and the surrounding community thrived alongside it. By 1905, over two million freight, passenger, mail, baggage, and express cars and 89,000 locomotives were equipped with Westinghouse Air Brakes. However, business was seasonally variable, and there were dips as well. Wilmerding men complained that, during the non-busy season, half routinely found themselves unemployed. This was not surprising, given that Wilmerding was a one-industry town, and thus unprofitable periods translated directly into a lower standard of living in the area.

In the early 1900s, the Westinghouse Company built houses on a tract of land that it had purchased. In turn, it then sold those homes to its workers at an economical price. The company also offered educational and cultural activities, usually run through the local Y.M.C.A, to obtain better workers. Additionally, WA&B catered to its workers who lost their ability to work, by providing an early form of a disability insurance plan. To insure a certain income to employees who might have been unfit for work because of illness or injury, an ordered sum would be paid to the beneficiary. Any employee under 50 was eligible for membership after a physical examination. The members contributed according to the class which they belonged to, with their class being determined by the amount of money they made per month. Their contribution ranged from fifty cents to $1.50, which in turn (in case of disability) would pay out benefits for thirty-nine consecutive weeks. According to Wilmerding News during this time, about 76% of WA&B's employees held a plan membership with the company.

The Westinghouse Air Brake company continued producing products in Wilmerding, with various managers over the years. However, with the shedding of Pittsburgh's industrial past, the company had become proportionally less important.

In 1930 Westinghouse Automotive Air Brake Company merged with Bendix Corporation to form the Bendix-Westinghouse Automotive Air Brake Company.

=== Wabco's heavy equipment range ===
Between 1967 and 1983 Wabco competed, initially successfully, for market share in the heavy equipment marketplace. In 1984, Wabco's entire construction and mining equipment division (motor graders, off-highway trucks, dump trucks, motor scrapers, manufacturing facilities) was sold to Dresser Industries. The only performing segment of its construction and mining division, the Haulpak truck range, were re-branded by Dresser and continued to trade. In 1988 Dresser entered into a joint-venture with Komatsu Ltd and the truck range continued to be manufactured.

=== Successors WABCO Holdings and Wabtec ===
The company has two 21st-century successors, which are independent of each other. One, which continues to design and manufacture railway air brakes in Wilmerding, Pennsylvania, merged with locomotive manufacturer MotivePower to form Wabtec. The other, now known as WABCO Holdings, designs and manufactures control systems for commercial road vehicles, including air brakes, and is headquartered in Bern, Switzerland. WABCO Holdings was floated in a 2007 initial public offering by American Standard, WABCO's owners for 30 years.

On 28 March 2019, it was announced that WABCO Holdings was to be bought by ZF Friedrichshafen for US$7 billion, with the transaction completed in 2020. The United States Department of Justice stipulated that WABCO's North American heavy-vehicle steering components business (chiefly R.H. Sheppard Company, as acquired in 2017), had to be sold in order to preserve competition in this field.

== Development of the Westinghouse air brake ==
=== Straight air brake ===
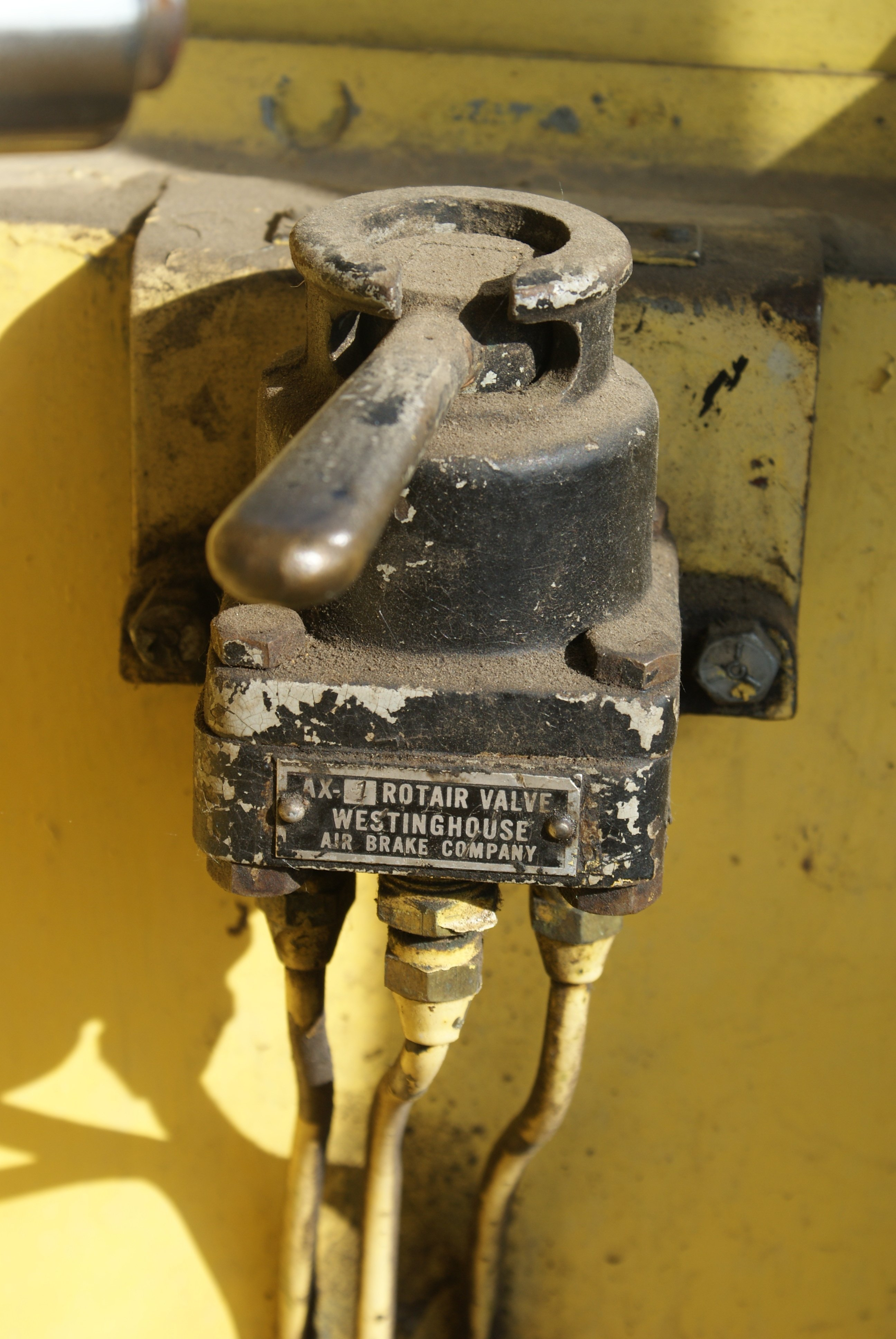
Westinghouse Air Brake Company's Rotair Valve

The first form of the air brake consisted of an air pump, a main reservoir (pressure vessel), and an engineer's valve on the locomotive, and of a train pipe and brake cylinder on each car. One problem with this first form of the air brake was that braking was applied to the first cars in a train much sooner than to the rear cars, resulting in shocks and damages when the rear cars bunted against the cars ahead of them.

The main objection, however, was that it was not an automatic brake, i.e. even a minor mishap like a broken coupling left the entire train without any brake power at all.

=== Plain automatic air brake ===
In 1872, George Westinghouse invented the automatic air brake by inventing the triple valve and by equipping each car with its own air cylinder. Air pressure is maintained in the auxiliary reservoirs and in the train pipe at all times when the brakes are not applied. An equilibrium of air pressure is maintained in the train pipe and in the auxiliary air cylinders.

To apply the brakes to all of the cars at about the same time, pressure is released from the train pipe, causing the triple valve on each car to apply the brakes. To release the brakes on each car, pressure is increased in the train pipe until an excess pressure above that of the pressure in each auxiliary cylinder is reached, which throws the triple valve so as to close the inlet to the brake cylinder and open the inlet to the auxiliary reservoir from the train pipe, thus allowing the equilibrium of the two pressures to be reached.

=== Quick-action triple valve ===
Although the plain automatic air brake was a great improvement over the straight air brake, in an emergency the system still applied the brakes to the last cars in a train later than to the first cars in a train. To remedy that condition, George Westinghouse invented the quick-action triple valve in 1887. This triple valve system was tested by George Westinghouse on the CB&Q West Burlington hill (Iowa) during 1887. It automatically vents air from the brake pipe locally on each car, which applies the brakes more quickly.

=== Electric railways ===
For the air brake to be employed on electric railways, an air compressor that is powered by electricity is required. Powerful electric locomotives were produced by the Westinghouse Electric & Manufacturing Company and by other companies.

=== Wheel-slide protection ===
In the 1930s, the company developed a wheel slide protection system called Decelostat that worked with its air brake.

== See also ==
- LeTourneau Technologies - LeTourneau-Westinghouse grew from the acquisition of R.G LeTourneau's company
- Haulpak – Manufacturer of high capacity haul trucks, now part of Komatsu
- WABCO Vehicle Control Systems – a successor of Westinghouse Air Brake Company
- Wabtec – also a successor of Westinghouse Air Brake Company
- Westinghouse Brake and Signal Company Ltd – Chippenham, Wiltshire, UK
- Knorr-Bremse – successor of the Chippenham air brake business
- Union Switch & Signal – WABCO subsidiary
- Melpar – Government contract subsidiary from 1951 until the 1970s
