= Komatsu 830E =

The Komatsu 830E is an ultra class haul truck used in open pit mining designed and built in Peoria, Illinois by Komatsu America Corporation, whose parent company is the Japanese held company Komatsu Ltd.

The Komatsu 830E is notable for the rated capacity of 231 t (255 short tons). While large, the 830E's capacity is just under two-thirds the capacity of its two largest competitors, the Liebherr T 282C and Caterpillar 797B. It differs from conventional dump trucks as it uses an electric drive system instead of a transmission/differential drive. The diesel engine is connected to a GE traction alternator then high voltage cables transfer electricity to the two wheel motors at the rear of the truck.

Previously the 830E was made by Dresser Industries, before it was taken over by Komatsu.

Komatsu 830E specifications
body capacity	231 t (255 short tons)
transmission type	diesel-electric
power	1,835 kW (2,461 hp)
unladen Weight	154.852 t (170.695 short tons)
heaped Capacity	147 m^{3} (192 cu yd)
loading Height	6.71 m (22.0 ft)
dump Angle	45°
engine model	Komatsu SDA16V160/Cummins QSK60
engine displacement	60 L (3,700 cu in)
number of cylinders	16
Transmission type	Diesel electric Drive; 4x2
Maximum speed	62 km/h (39 mph)
Gradeability	20%
Weight distribution, Dimensions, etc.
Operating Weight	385.852 t (425.329 short tons)
Length	14.15 m (46.4 ft)
Width	7.29 m (23.9 ft)
Height	6.88 m (22.6 ft)
Turning circle	28.4 m (93 ft)
Tyres F/R	40.00R57
