= Basilica of St. Michael the Archangel =

Basilica of St. Michael the Archangel may refer to:

- Basilica of St. Michael, Mondsee, Austria
- St. Michael's Basilica (Miramichi, New Brunswick)
- Basilica of St. Michael, Bordeaux, France
- Basilica of St Michael the Archangel, or Tayabas Basilica, Philippines
- Basílica pontificia de San Miguel, Madrid, Spain
- Basilica of St. Michael the Archangel (Loretto, Pennsylvania), US
- Basilica of St. Michael the Archangel (Pensacola, Florida), US
