= Washington County Jail (Washington, Pennsylvania) =

- U.S. National Register of Historic Places
- Washington County History & Landmarks Foundation Landmark
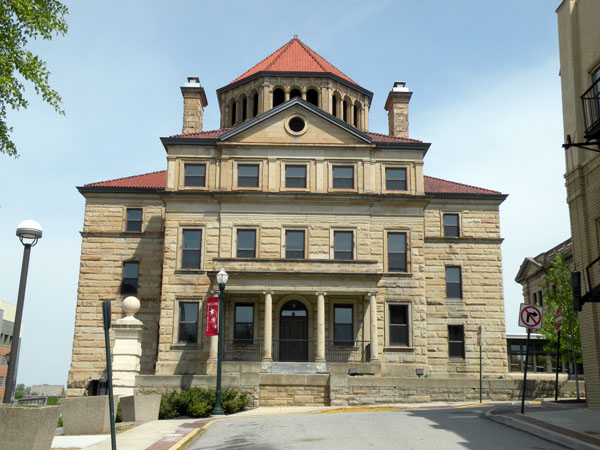
- Washington County Jail

- Location within Pennsylvania
- Location: Cherry Street, Washington, PA
- Coordinates: 40°10′12.85″N 80°14′46.78″W
- Built: 1899
- Architect: F. J. Osterling
- NRHP reference No.: 74001813
- Added to NRHP: July 30, 1974

The Washington County Jail is located on Cherry Street, beside the courthouse, in downtown Washington, Pennsylvania.

It was listed on the National Register of Historic Places on July 30, 1974. It is designated as a historic public landmark by the Washington County History & Landmarks Foundation.

== See also ==
- National Register of Historic Places listings in Washington County, Pennsylvania

== Gallery ==
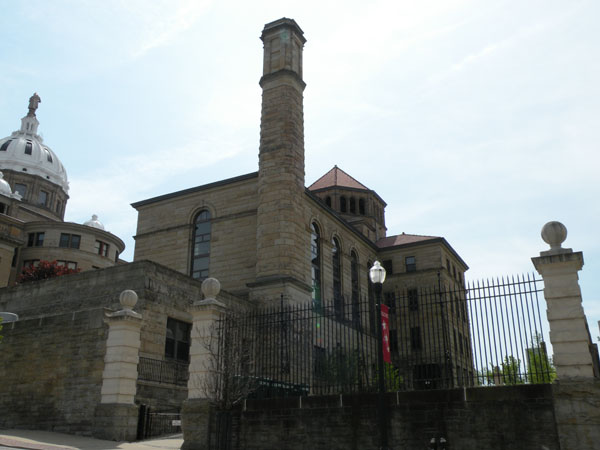
A view of the other side of the jail, from West Beau Street
