= Byrnes & Kiefer Building =

- U.S. National Register of Historic Places
- Pittsburgh Landmark – PHLF
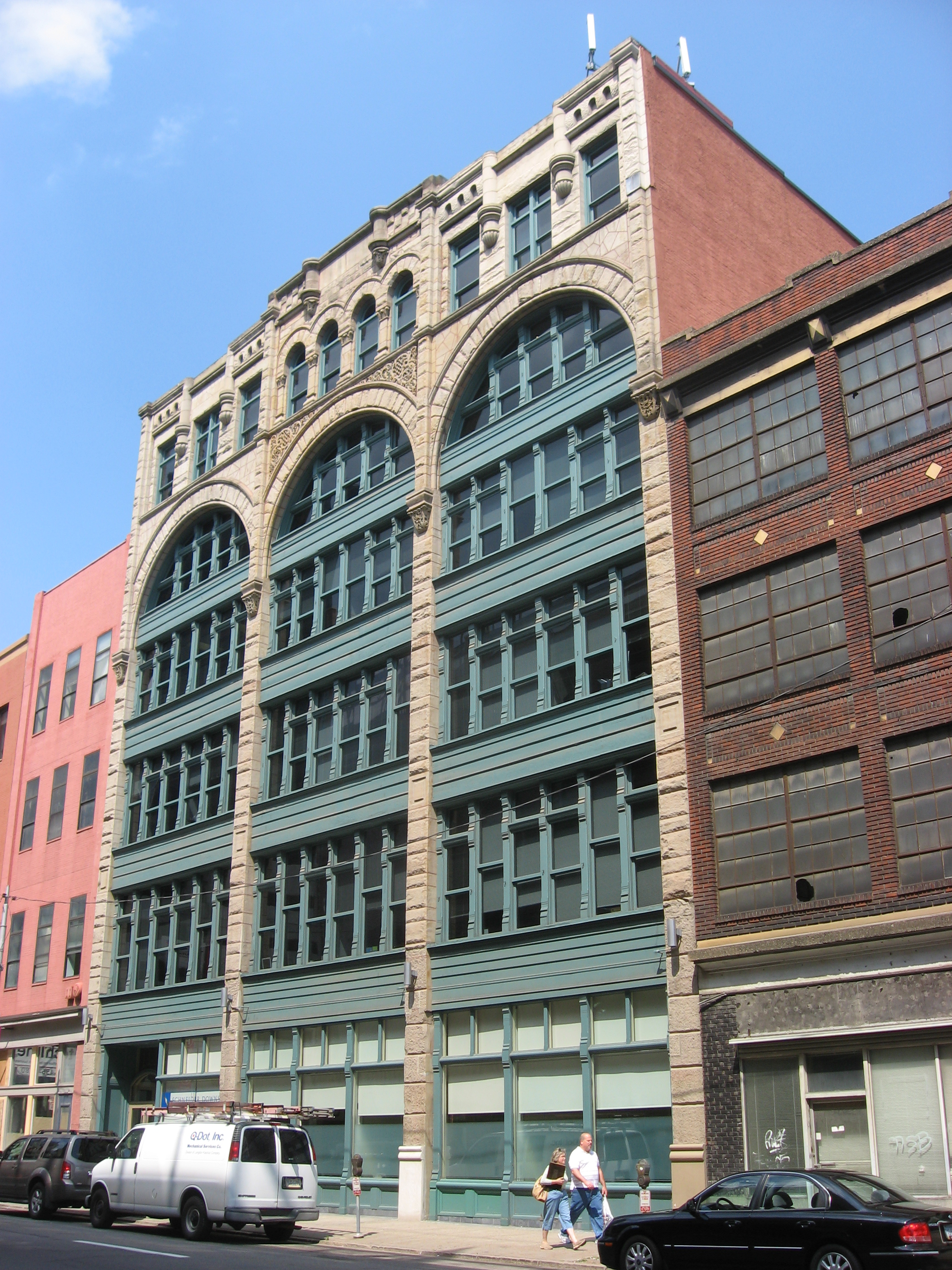

- Location within Pittsburgh Location within Pennsylvania Location within the United States
- Location: 1127-1133 Penn Ave., Pittsburgh, Pennsylvania
- Coordinates: 40°26′44″N 79°59′36″W
- Area: 0.2 acres (0.081 ha)
- Built: 1892
- Architect: Frederick J. Osterling?
- Architectural style: Romanesque Revival
- NRHP reference No.: 85000457

Significant dates
- Added to NRHP: March 07, 1985
- Designated PHLF: 1987

The Byrnes & Kiefer Building in the Strip District neighborhood of Pittsburgh, Pennsylvania, is a building from 1892. It was listed on the National Register of Historic Places in 1985.
