= Union Trust Building (Pittsburgh) =

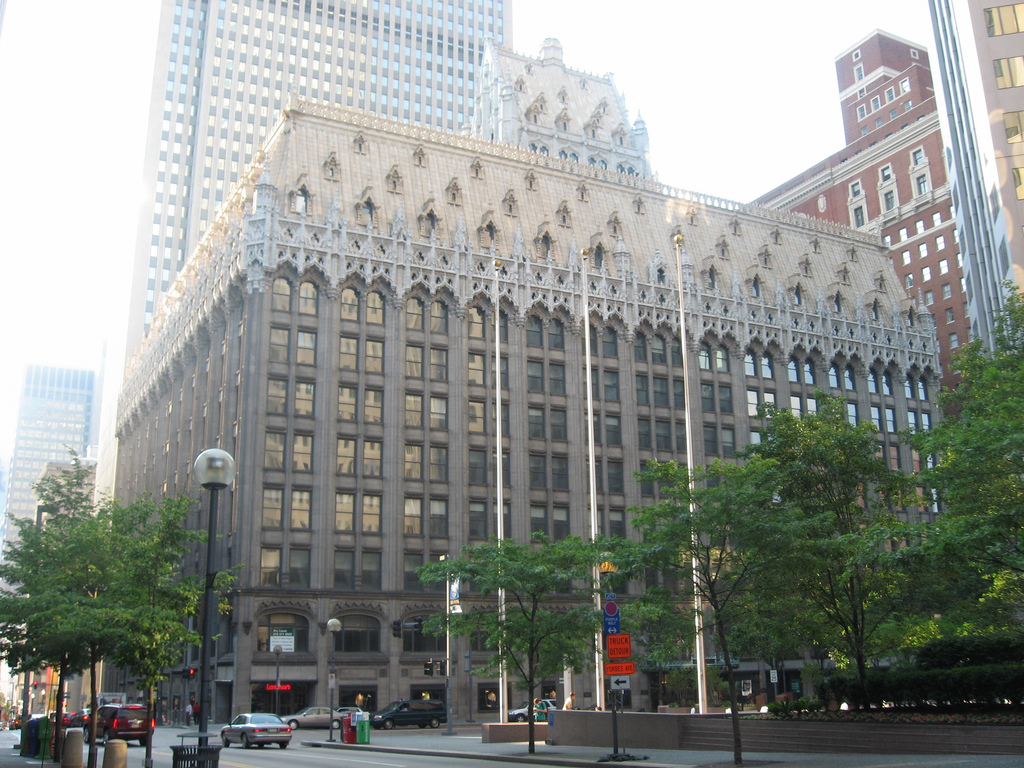
- Exterior of the Union Trust Building on Grant Street in Downtown Pittsburgh
- Interactive map of the Union Trust Building area

General information
- Type: Offices
- Location: 501 Grant Street, Pittsburgh, Pennsylvania
- Coordinates: 40.440°N 79.997°W
- Completed: 1916
- Opening: 1917
- Cost: $1,497,000
- Owner: DIV 501 Grant Limited Partnership, an affiliate of The Davis Companies

Height
- Roof: 237 ft (72 m)

Technical details
- Floor count: 15
- Floor area: 550,000 ft^{2} (51,097 m^{2})
- Lifts/elevators: 10

Design and construction
- Architect: Frederick J. Osterling
- Developer: Henry Clay Frick
- Main contractor: George A. Fuller Company
- Union Trust Building
- U.S. National Register of Historic Places
- Pittsburgh Landmark – PHLF
- Location: 501 Grant St. Pittsburgh, Pennsylvania
- Area: 1 acre (0.40 ha)
- Built: 1916
- Architect: Graham, Anderson, Probst & White; Harry L. Widom
- Architectural style: Renaissance, Gothic, French Renaissance
- NRHP reference No.: 74001748

Significant dates
- Added to NRHP: January 21, 1974
- Designated PHLF: 1968

The Union Trust Building is a high-rise building located in the Downtown district of Pittsburgh, Pennsylvania, at 501 Grant Street. It was erected in 1915–16 by the industrialist Henry Clay Frick. The Flemish-Gothic structure's original purpose was to serve as a shopping arcade.

== History ==
Known as the Union Arcade, it featured 240 shops and galleries. The mansard roof is adorned with terra cotta dormers and two chapel-like mechanical towers. The interior is arranged about a central rotunda, capped by a stained glass dome. The building is listed on the National Register of Historic Places.

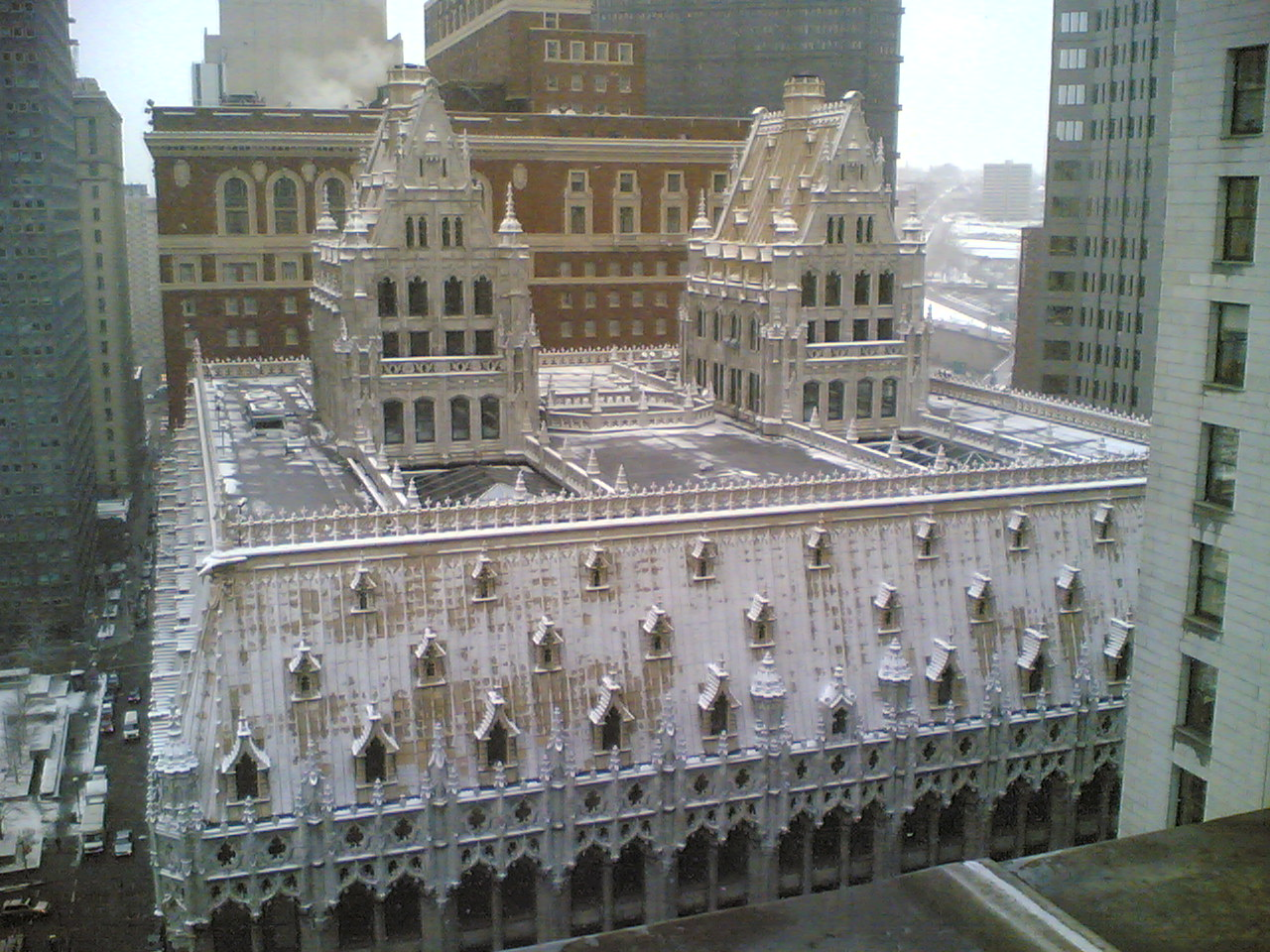
The roof of the Union Trust Building

Designed by Frederick J. Osterling, the building was constructed on the site of Pittsburgh's nineteenth century St. Paul's Catholic Cathedral. It is not known to have been modeled after any particular building, but Brussels Town Hall, Leuven Town Hall (both Brabantine Gothic) and the then-new Woolworth Building have been suggested as influences. The design has also been partially attributed to Pierre A. Liesch (1872–1954), who worked with Osterling on the project. Liesch was a native of Luxembourg and later used a similar Flemish Gothic style for his design of the Croatian Fraternal Union Building.

The Union Trust Company purchased the structure in 1923, renaming it from the Union Arcade to the Union Trust Building, as well as remodeling the first four floors.

Many people believe that the building's unique roof is the result of a restrictive covenant placed on the land by its previous owner, the Diocese of Pittsburgh. One story is that the bishop at the time (Rev. Richard Phelan) placed a restrictive covenant on the land when Frick purchased it so that, although it would now have commercial purposes, residents would always remember the cathedral that once stood there. Another story suggests that there is a requirement that a place of worship must be maintained perpetually on the site, and thus there is supposedly a chapel in one of the towers to comply. This is all urban legend – there was no restrictive covenant or other restriction in the original 1901 deed transferring ownership from religious to secular use.

On May 31, 1984 San Francisco 49ers, Pittsburgh Penguins and Pittsburgh Maulers owner Edward J. DeBartolo, Sr. purchased the building.

In 2008, it was purchased by California investors Michael Kamen and Gerson Fox; by August 2012 the building was the subject of bankruptcy proceedings to avoid a sheriff's sale.

In 2014 the property was sold at a foreclosure auction for $14 million to its current owner, an affiliate of Boston-based The Davis Companies. The Davis Companies' affiliate outbid lender SA Challenger. Extensive restorations were completed in 2016 at a cost of $100 million, including cleaning the exterior stone and lighting the facade at night; extensively repairing and restoring the mansard roof using the original terra-cotta molds; restoring the bronze storefronts; and relighting the stained-glass dome atop the 150-ft-high rotunda, and with two first-floor restaurants opening and restoration of the tenth-floor theater yet to be completed.

== Popular culture ==
The building is featured in the 2010 rap video "Black and Yellow" and is seen in the movie She's Out of My League.
