= Carnegie Free Library of Beaver Falls =

- Carnegie Free Library, Beaver Falls
- U.S. National Register of Historic Places
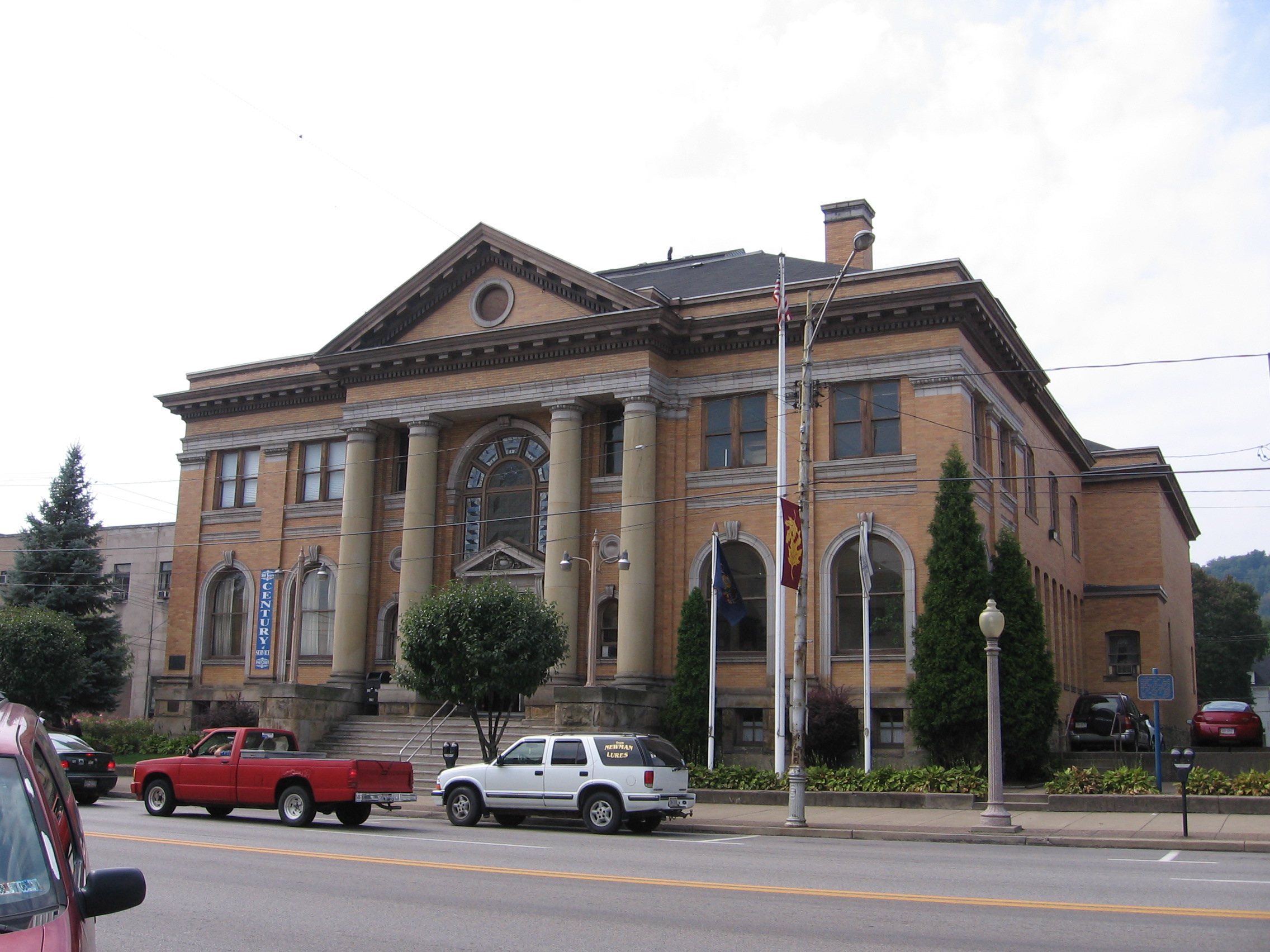
- Front and northern side of the library

- Location within Pennsylvania Location within the United States
- Location: 1301 Seventh Avenue, Beaver Falls, Pennsylvania
- Coordinates: 40°45′15″N 80°19′12″W
- Area: 1 acre (0.40 ha)
- Built: 1899
- Architect: Frederick J. Osterling
- Architectural style: Neoclassical
- NRHP reference No.: 85001967
- Added to NRHP: September 5, 1985

The Carnegie Free Library of Beaver Falls is a historic Carnegie library in the city of Beaver Falls, Pennsylvania, United States. Erected as Beaver County's first library building, it was financed by Andrew Carnegie and designed by a leading Pittsburgh architect in grand architectural style that helped to redefine the image of the typical Carnegie library. Numerous community organizations have used its space, which remains in continued use as a library, and it has been named a historic site.

== History ==
In late 1883, community leaders formed a private library association, and a related lecture series was held to raise money through ticket sales. Small enough that it could fit in a grocery store, the resulting collection experienced enough use that it could be seen to be too small for the community's needs, even though it was a subscription library. The association continued sponsoring lectures, and one of their invited speakers was Andrew Carnegie: finding himself unable to accept their invitation, Carnegie donated a small amount of money to the association's finances. His willingness to assist the association spurred leaders to seek money from him to construct an entirely new building. After several years of negotiations, the industrialist agreed to contribute $50,000 toward a library building.

Their finances secured, the association bought a parcel of land in downtown Beaver Falls and contracted with Pittsburgh architect Frederick J. Osterling to design its new home. Osterling's office produced a grand Neoclassical design, and construction began in 1899, although the building only opened for public use a week before Christmas 1903. It quickly gained recognition: locals saw it as a landmark, and its grandeur attracted the attention of Carnegie and his assistant James Bertram. Its construction marks a turning point in the architecture of Carnegie libraries in Pennsylvania: Carnegie and Bertram's disgust at the grand architecture of libraries such as Beaver Falls induced them to announce that future Carnegie libraries would be substantially smaller buildings with simpler standardized floor plans.

The first building in Beaver County built as a library, it immediately became a community center as well. As property of the local school district, the library was soon integrated into scholastic activities; arts performances and commencements were held on its stage. Moreover, it was the first building anywhere in Beaver County with space for stage performances, so it also hosted community events unrelated to the school board's activities. Growing numbers of children in the city forced the school board to use some of the second floor for classrooms starting in 1915, and only in 1931 were all children able to be moved to a normal school building. As the twentieth century progressed, events at the library became fewer, but it has remained a prominent piece of the community's culture and built environment.

== Architecture ==
Two stories tall, the library is a Neoclassical building with Palladian influences. Built of yellow brick, it occupies a raised stone foundation; the granite details at the top of the foundation sit 4 feet (1.2 m) above the ground. Multiple buttresses are placed on all sides but the rear (west), both supporting the roof and dividing the walls into segments. Numerous windows are placed mid the buttresses; between the ordinary windows found in most places and the massive fanlight-topped stained glass window at the center of the facade, the building has so much glass (all uninsulated) that it suffers substantial heat loss because of the fenestration. Even the highest parts of the library are pierced for lighting, as dormer windows and a skylight are located in various parts of the roof. Many of the windows are trimmed with terracotta, while large stone risers project from the front on both sides of the stairs. The most prominent part of the building is the entrance on the east front, which is framed by two pairs of columns and crowned with a prominent pediment. Lesser facades are built on the northern and southern sides, while the western side's exposure to an alleyway has been extensively modified (e.g. the closing of windows) to discourage vandalism and theft.

Inside, the library features three floors. Both the basement and first floor are comparable to those of other Carnegie libraries built at the same time: the utility rooms are placed in the basement, along with community meeting facilities, while the first floor centers on the reference/circulation desk and features space for stacks, adult reading rooms, and children's space. Upstairs, the second floor is occupied by a genealogical library, the Beaver County Research and Resource Center for Local History, and the city's historical museum is located in the basement.

Most of the original performance hall in the basement was dismantled in 1961 with the goal of conversion into shelving and reading space, but it was soon renovated as space rented by a state government agency, the Bureau of Employment Security, before being re-converted for the city museum. Few other major changes have been performed: the second-floor ceiling was lowered to improve heating efficiency, and a small wall was added atop the staircase to prevent people falling down the stairs, but the main floor's high ceilings have remained, and virtually all of the building's original never-painted woodworking survives. Hand-carven details can be found throughout the building's walnut and oak trim, much of which also features larger components such as Ionic columns that appear to support the ceilings.

== Preservation ==
By the mid-1980s, the governing board of Beaver Falls' school district had recognized the historic significance of the library's architecture: its unusual degree of preservation is partly the result of a board policy prohibiting changes that would detract from its status. The building gained much wider recognition in 1985, when it was added to the National Register of Historic Places; it qualified both because of its architecture and because of its place in local history. One of twenty such locations in Beaver County, it is the only one in Beaver Falls. It continues to be used as a library, although the institution is now part of a larger library system serving the entire county.
