= Commonwealth Building (Pittsburgh) =

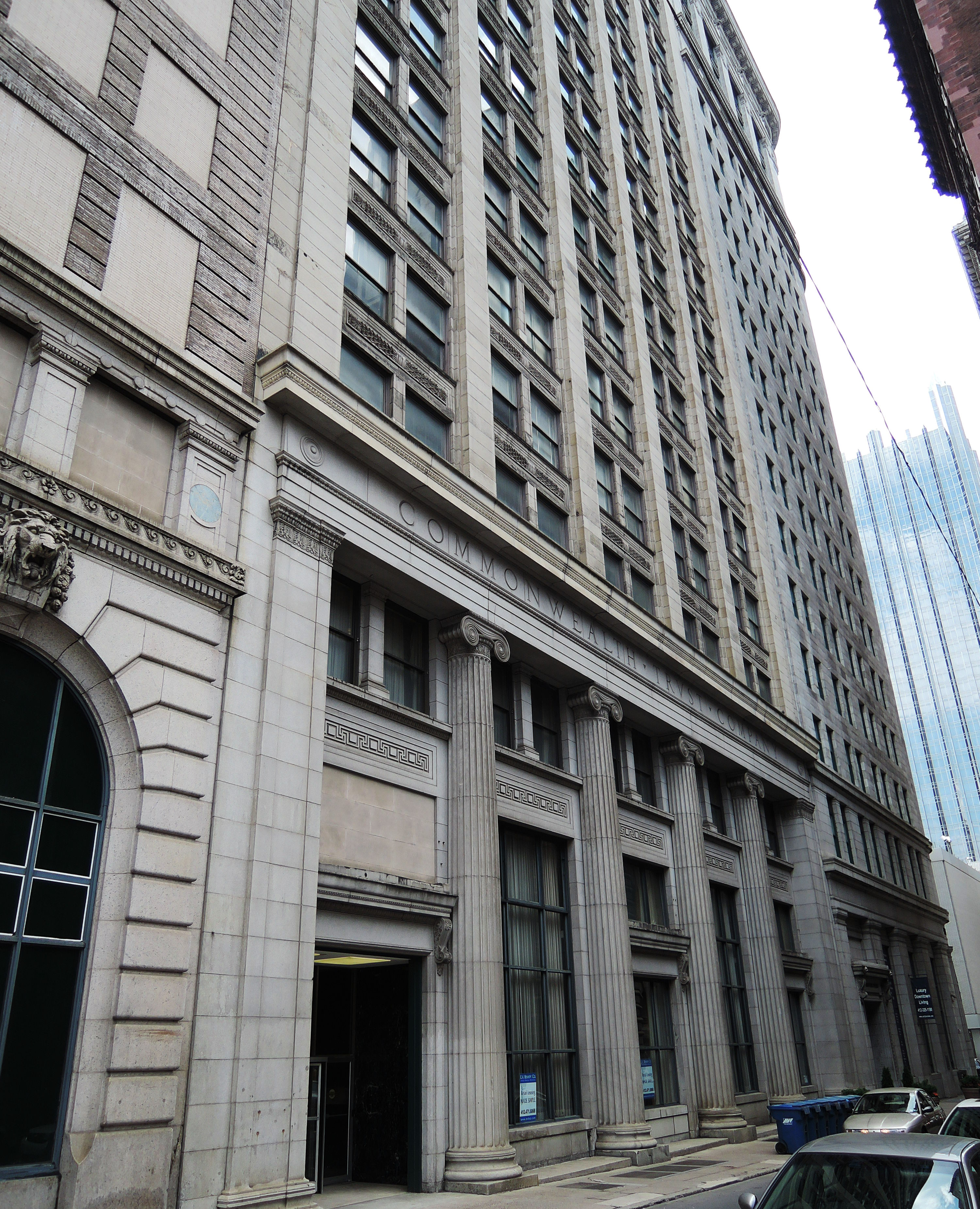
- Fourth Avenue
- Interactive map of the Commonwealth Building area

General information
- Location: 316 Fourth Avenue, Pittsburgh, Pennsylvania
- Coordinates: 40°26′21″N 80°00′03″W
- Completed: 1906

Height
- Roof: 300 ft (91 m)

Technical details
- Floor count: 21
- Floor area: 80,000 ft^{2} (7,432 m^{2})

Design and construction
- Architect: Frederick J. Osterling

The Commonwealth Building, originally known as the Commonwealth Trust Bank, is a 300 feet (91 m) tall skyscraper in Pittsburgh. It was completed in 1906 and has 21 floors. It is tied with The Carlyle and Washington Plaza for 26th tallest building in the city.

== History ==
The building was built in 1906 for the Commonwealth Trust Company, with construction underway by June 1906. Work was briefly halted on August 3, 1906 when workers went on strike, over wages of $1.75 a day, compared to union workers on the nearby Union National Bank Building, who were earning $2.00 a day. By August 5, 1906 the dispute had been settled and the building's framework had been completed up to the twelfth floor. The building was completed in 1907, with the Commonwealth Trust Company moving in by April 1, vacating their previous residence at 327-329 Fourth Avenue. The building included five Plunger-type elevators, built by the Otis Elevator Company to service the structure's twenty floors.

On November 1, 1927, Andrew J Kelley Jr, then president of the Commonwealth Trust Company and the Commonwealth Real Estate Company, died suddenly in his office in the Commonwealth Building. The building also served as the offices for the Steel Workers Organizing Committee, and later the United Steelworkers. On June 1, 1954, first assistant county solicitor Edward G. Bothwell was shot three times and critically wounded by George E Linn in his office on the fourth floor of the Commonwealth Building, after losing a 10-year court case previously.

In January 2019, it was announced that the then long-vacant building would be renovated into an apartment complex featuring 150 apartments and ground level retail.

== See also ==
- List of tallest buildings in Pittsburgh

Preceded by Washington Plaza	Pittsburgh Skyscrapers by Height; 300 feet (91 m); 21 floors	Succeeded by Four Gateway Center
Preceded by The Carlyle	Pittsburgh Skyscrapers by Year of Completion; 1906	Succeeded by Oliver Building
