= Frederick J. Osterling Office and Studio =

Historic office building built 1917

- U.S. National Register of Historic Places
- Pittsburgh Landmark – PHLF
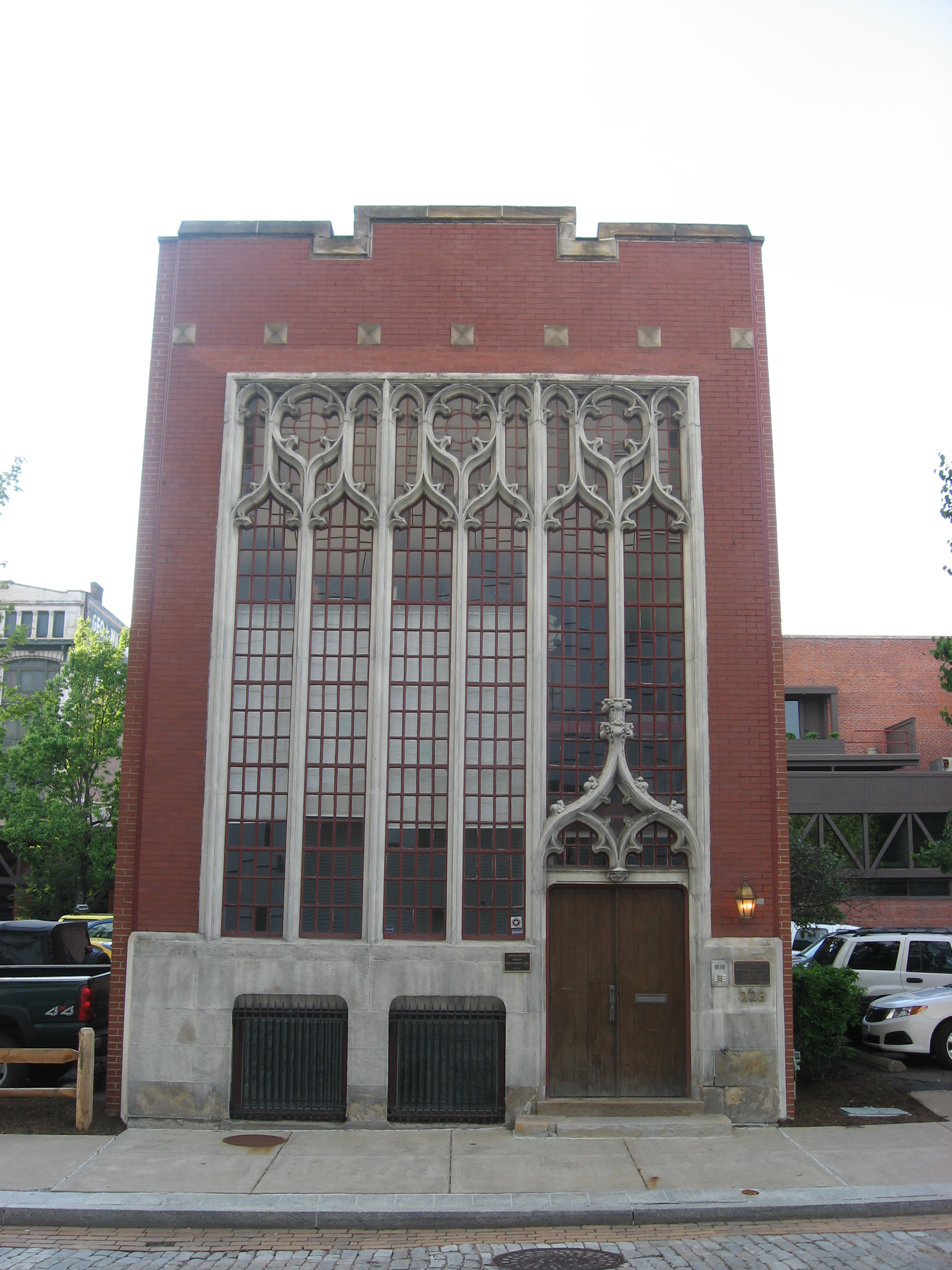

- Location within Pittsburgh Location within Pennsylvania Location within the United States
- Location: 228 Isabella Street (North Shore), Pittsburgh, Pennsylvania, USA
- Coordinates: 40°26′54″N 80°0′6″W
- Built: 1917
- Architect: Frederick J. Osterling
- Architectural style: Gothic Revival
- NRHP reference No.: 85001964

Significant dates
- Added to NRHP: September 5, 1985
- Designated PHLF: 2004

The Frederick J. Osterling Office and Studio at 228 Isabella Street in the North Shore neighborhood of Pittsburgh, Pennsylvania, was built in 1917. This Gothic Revival building was designed by architect Frederick J. Osterling, and was used as his office and studio in 1918.

It was added to the National Register of Historic Places on September 5, 1985, and the List of Pittsburgh History and Landmarks Foundation Historic Landmarks in 2004.

== Images ==
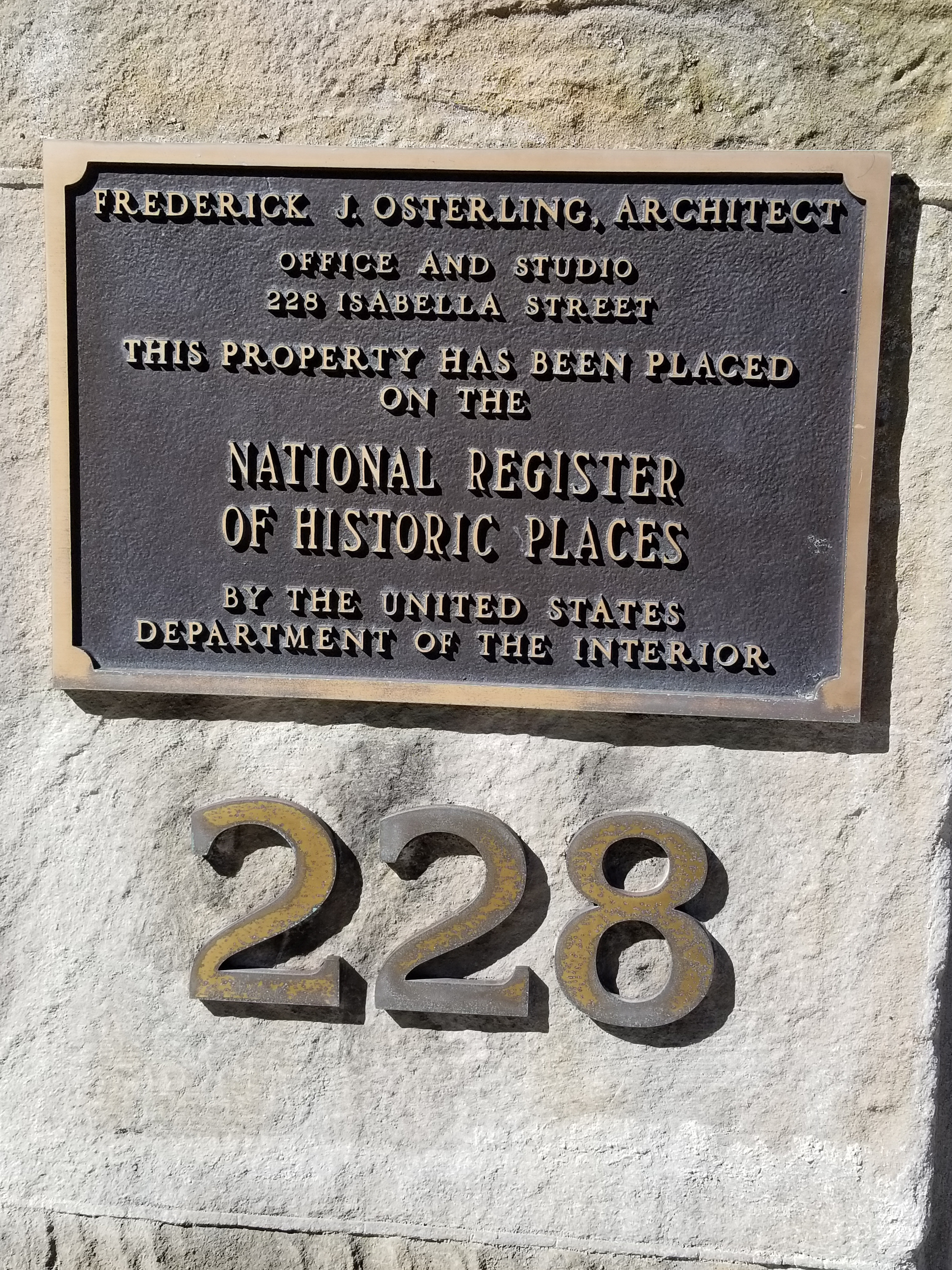
National Register of Historic Places plaque

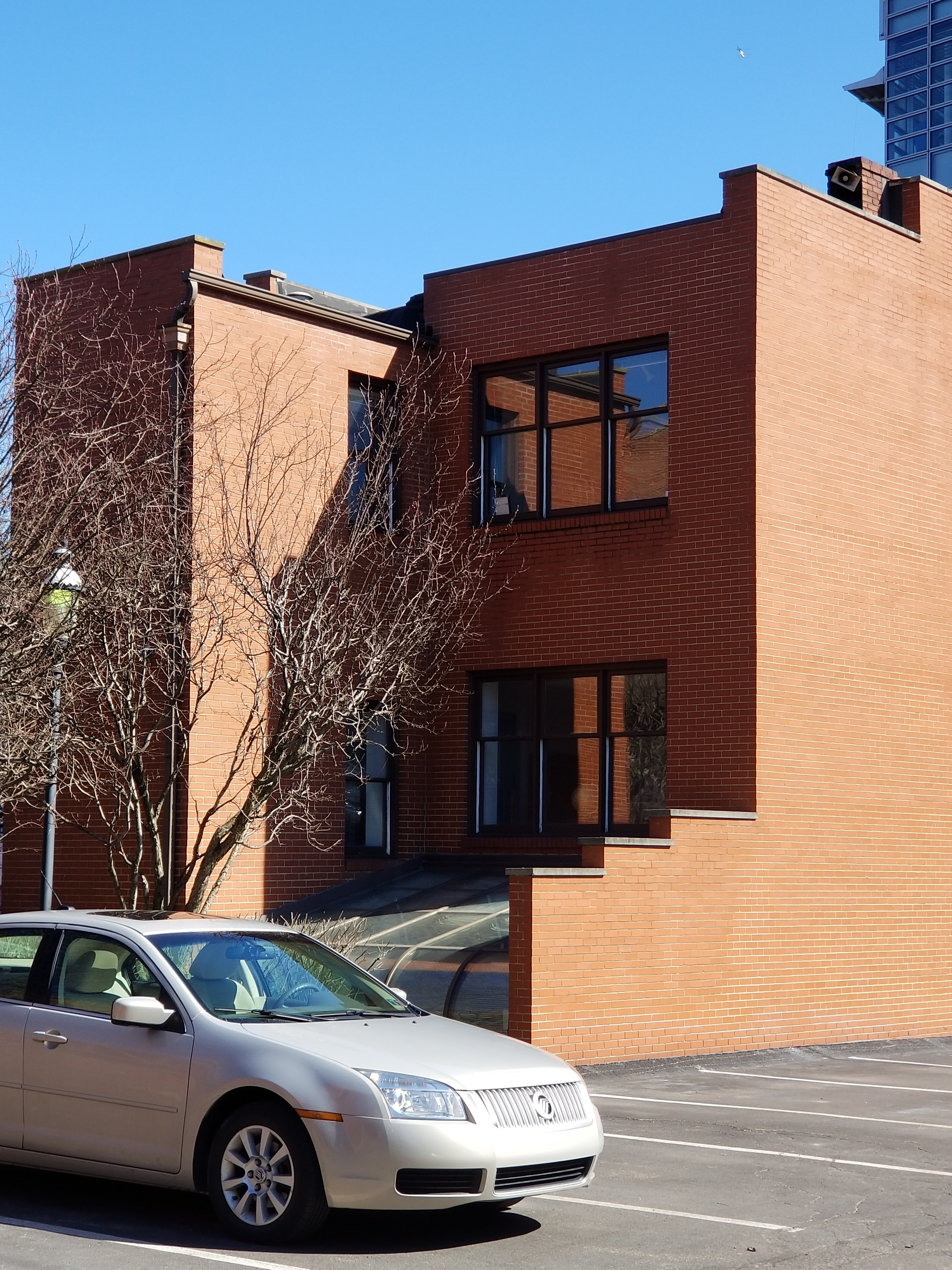
Rear view of the building

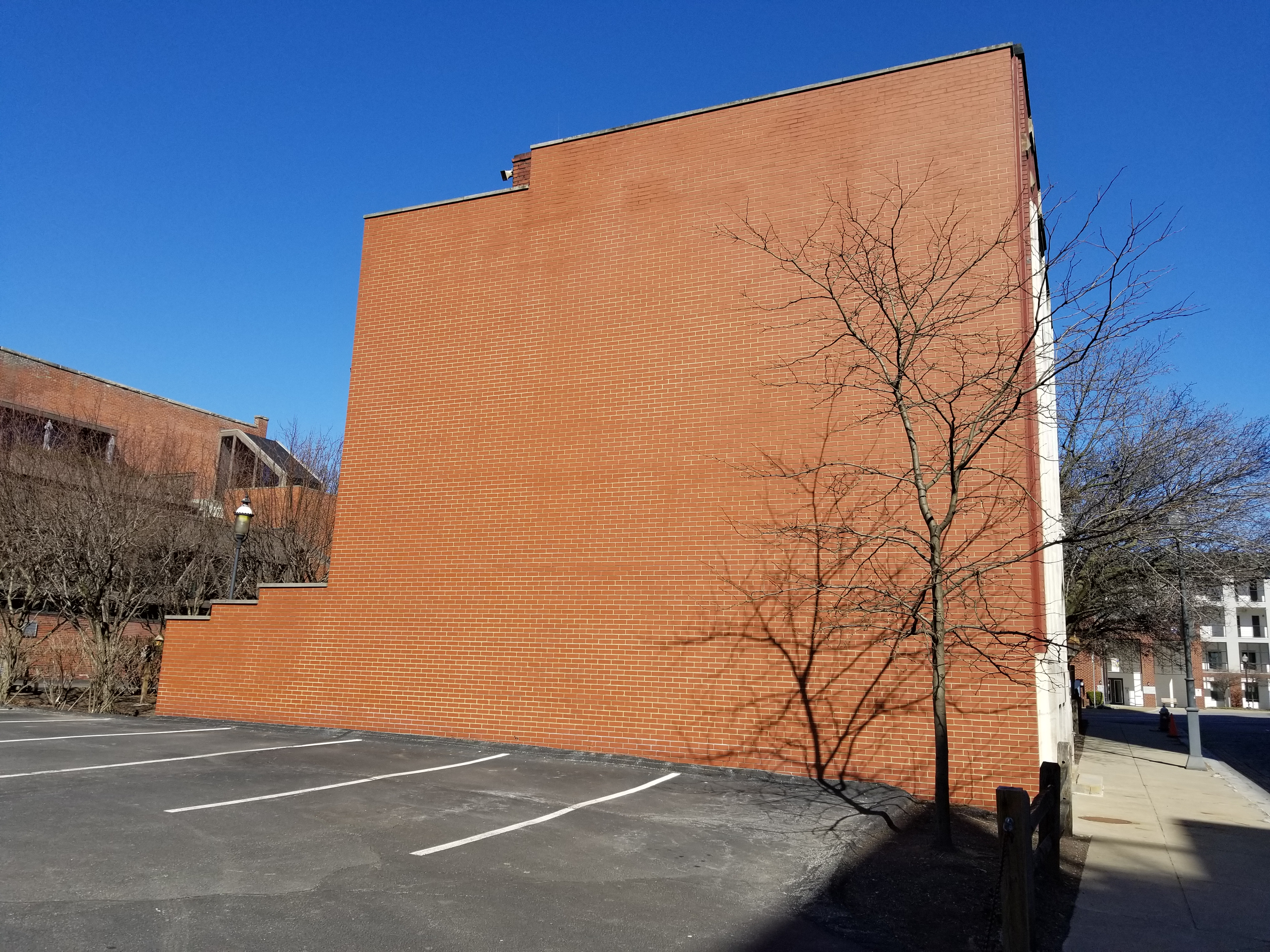
West side of the building
