= Negley–Gwinner–Harter House =

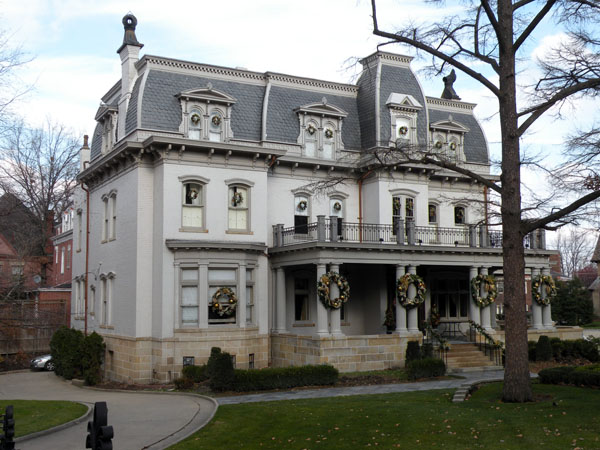

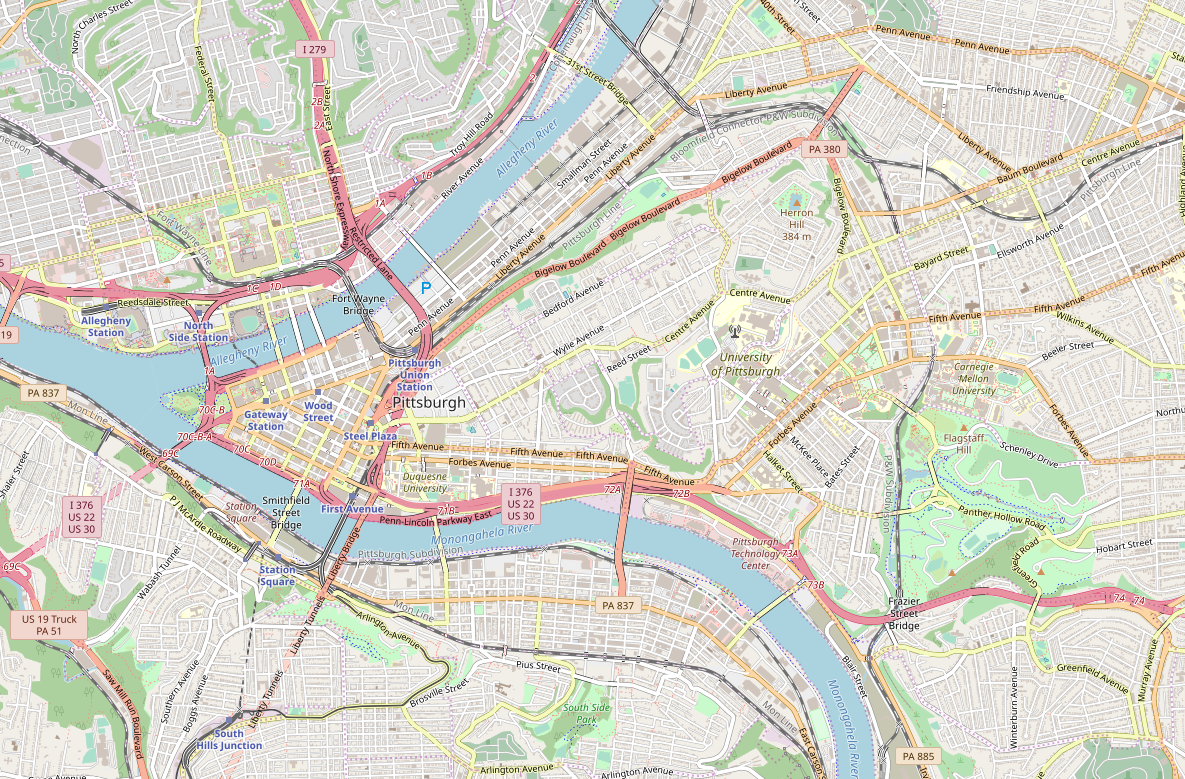
- Location of the Negley–Gwinner–Harter House in Pittsburgh
- 40°26′52.87″N 79°56′22.3″W
- Location: 5061 Fifth Avenue (Shadyside), Pittsburgh, Pennsylvania, USA

History
- Built: 1871

Pittsburgh Landmark – PHLF
- Designated: 2000

The Negley–Gwinner–Harter House (also known as the Gwinner–Harter House, and the William B. Negley House) is located at 5061 Fifth Avenue in the Shadyside neighborhood of Pittsburgh, Pennsylvania.

Built between 1870 and 1871 for William B. Negley (June 5, 1828 – January 16, 1894), a lawyer who attended Princeton University, served as a Major in the American Civil War under General James S. Negley, and was the son of Jacob Negley and the nephew of Sarah Negley and Thomas Mellon), this Second Empire-style house was added to the List of Pittsburgh History and Landmarks Foundation Historic Landmarks in 2000.

== History and architectural features ==
After Joanna Wilmerding (Bruce) Negley, the widow of William B. Negley, died in 1910, Edward Gwinner, a stone and railroad contractor, purchased the property in 1911. Gwinner then had it remodeled and expanded. The original architect is unknown, but Frederick J. Osterling remodeled the house and was responsible for additions between 1912 and 1923. Gwinner died in 1949, and his widow, Adele, owned it until 1963, when the house was sold to Dr. Leo Harter.

In 1987, a fire caused by a paint-stripping gun during renovation burned much of the third floor and damaged the roof. Harter died in 1988, and the house sat vacant for eight years, was boarded up, and had even been considered for demolition.

In 1995, restoration contractor Joedda Sampson and her husband Ben, a builder and developer, purchased the property and restored it. The restoration took nine months. In 2002, the house was purchased by Kenneth Lehn and Marina Persic Lehn. According to the Allegheny County Pennsylvania Real Estate Assessment Page, the house's estimated previous year market value for 2010 was $1,110,800.

This Second Empire-style house was added to the List of Pittsburgh History and Landmarks Foundation Historic Landmarks in 2000.
