= Washington County Courthouse (Pennsylvania) =

- U.S. National Register of Historic Places
- Washington County History & Landmarks Foundation Landmark
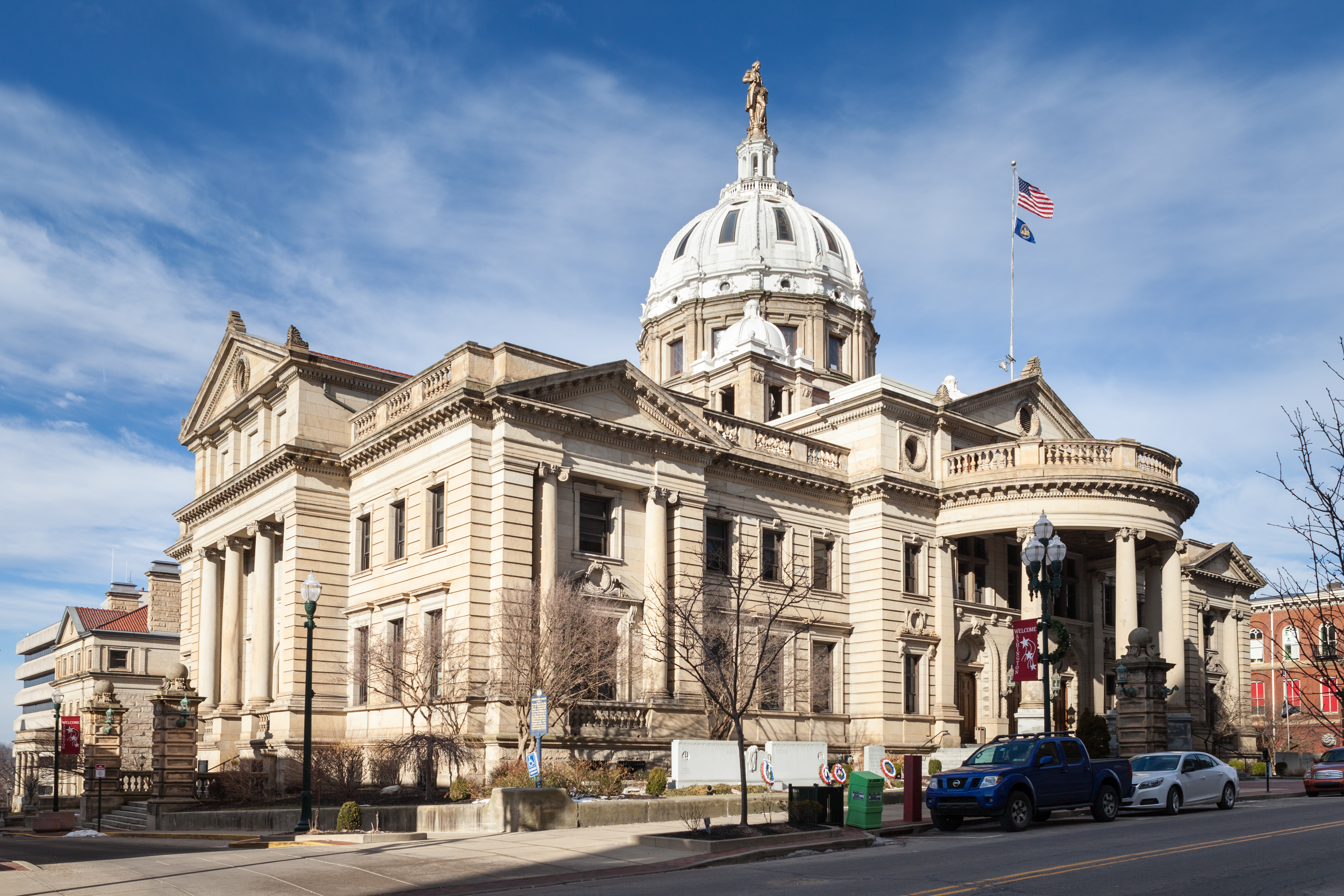
- Washington County Courthouse in January 2015

- Location within Pennsylvania
- Location: 1 South Main Street, Washington, Pennsylvania
- Coordinates: 40°10′13.62″N 80°14′44.89″W
- Built: 1900
- Architect: Frederick J. Osterling
- Architectural style: Beaux-Arts
- NRHP reference No.: 74001812
- Added to NRHP: July 30, 1974

The Washington County Courthouse is located in downtown Washington, Pennsylvania, United States. It was listed on the National Register of Historic Places on July 30, 1974. It is designated as a historic public landmark by the Washington County History & Landmarks Foundation.

On April 14, 1980, during the Presidential primary, Vice President Walter Mondale visited the courthouse for a campaign rally, calling out Democratic foe Ted Kennedy.

== See also ==
- National Register of Historic Places listings in Washington County, Pennsylvania
- List of state and county courthouses in Pennsylvania
