= Loretto, Pennsylvania =

Borough in Pennsylvania, US

- Borough
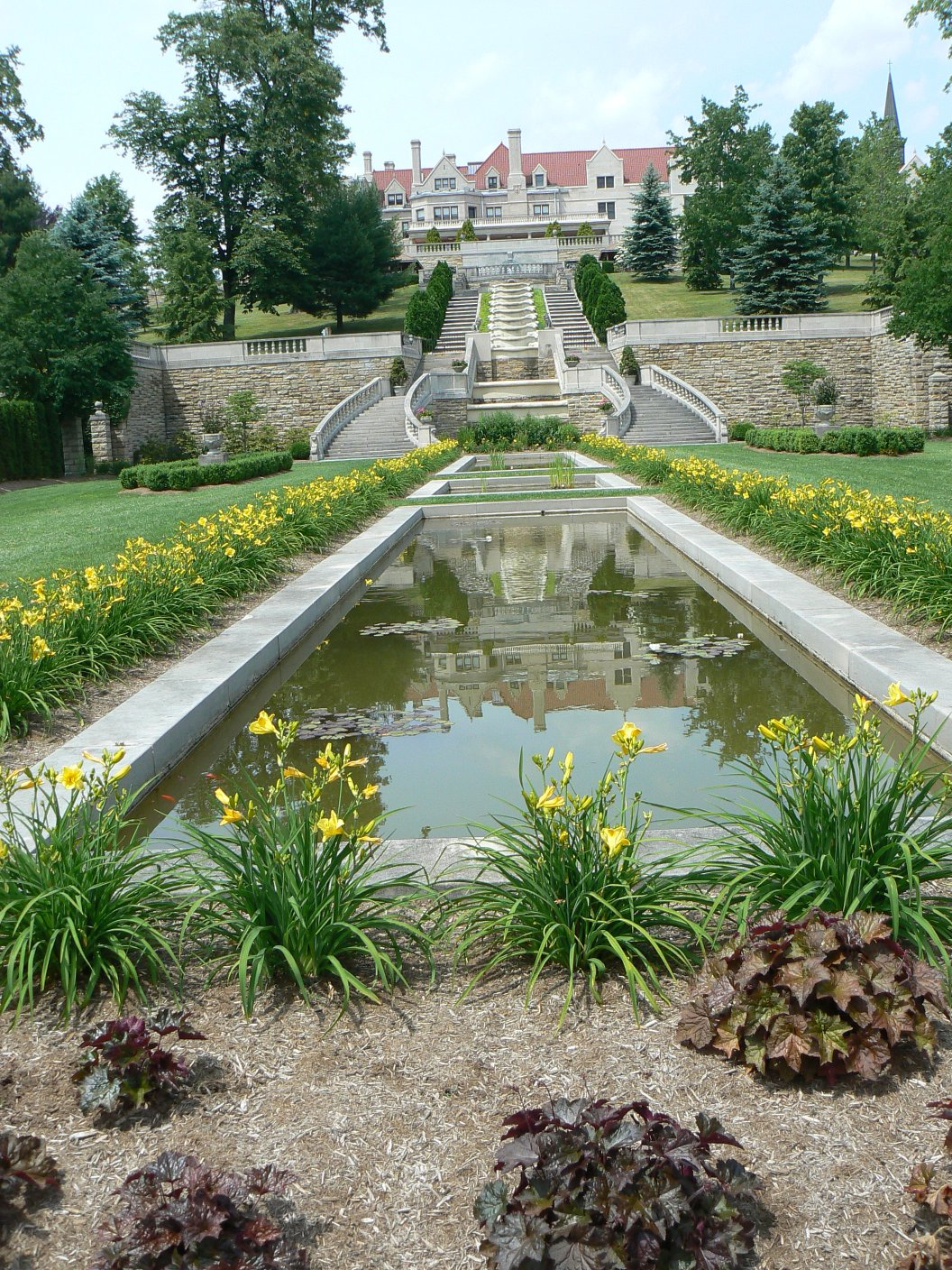
- The main house, cascades, and gardens of "Immergrün", Charles M. Schwab's retreat in Loretto

- Location of Loretto in Cambria County, Pennsylvania.

- Location within Pennsylvania
- Coordinates: 40°30′23″N 78°38′10″W
- Country: United States
- State: Pennsylvania
- County: Cambria
- Settled: 1788
- Incorporated: 1845

Government
  - Type: Borough council

Area
  - Total: 0.98 sq mi (2.55 km^{2})
  - Land: 0.98 sq mi (2.55 km^{2})
  - Water: 0 sq mi (0.00 km^{2})
- Elevation: 1,952 ft (595 m)

Population (2020)
  - Total: 1,196
  - Density: 1,215.9/sq mi (469.48/km^{2})
- Time zone: UTC-5 (Eastern (EST))
  - Summer (DST): UTC-4 (EDT)
- ZIP code: 15940
- Area code: 814
- FIPS code: 42-44704
- GNIS feature ID: 1215028

Loretto is a borough in Cambria County, Pennsylvania, United States. As of the 2020 census, Loretto had a population of 1,196. Like the rest of Cambria County, it is part of the Johnstown Metropolitan Statistical Area. Loretto is the home of Saint Francis University.

== Geography ==
Loretto is located in east-central Cambria County at 40°30′23″N 78°38′10″W (40.506355, -78.636066). It is 6 miles (10 km) east of Ebensburg, the Cambria County seat, and 17 miles (27 km) west of Altoona. Johnstown is 25 miles (40 km) to the southwest.

According to the U.S. Census Bureau, the borough of Loretto has a total area of 0.97 square miles (2.5 km^{2}), all land.

Saint Francis University, an institute of higher learning with an enrollment of 2,210, occupies the southwestern quadrant of the borough.

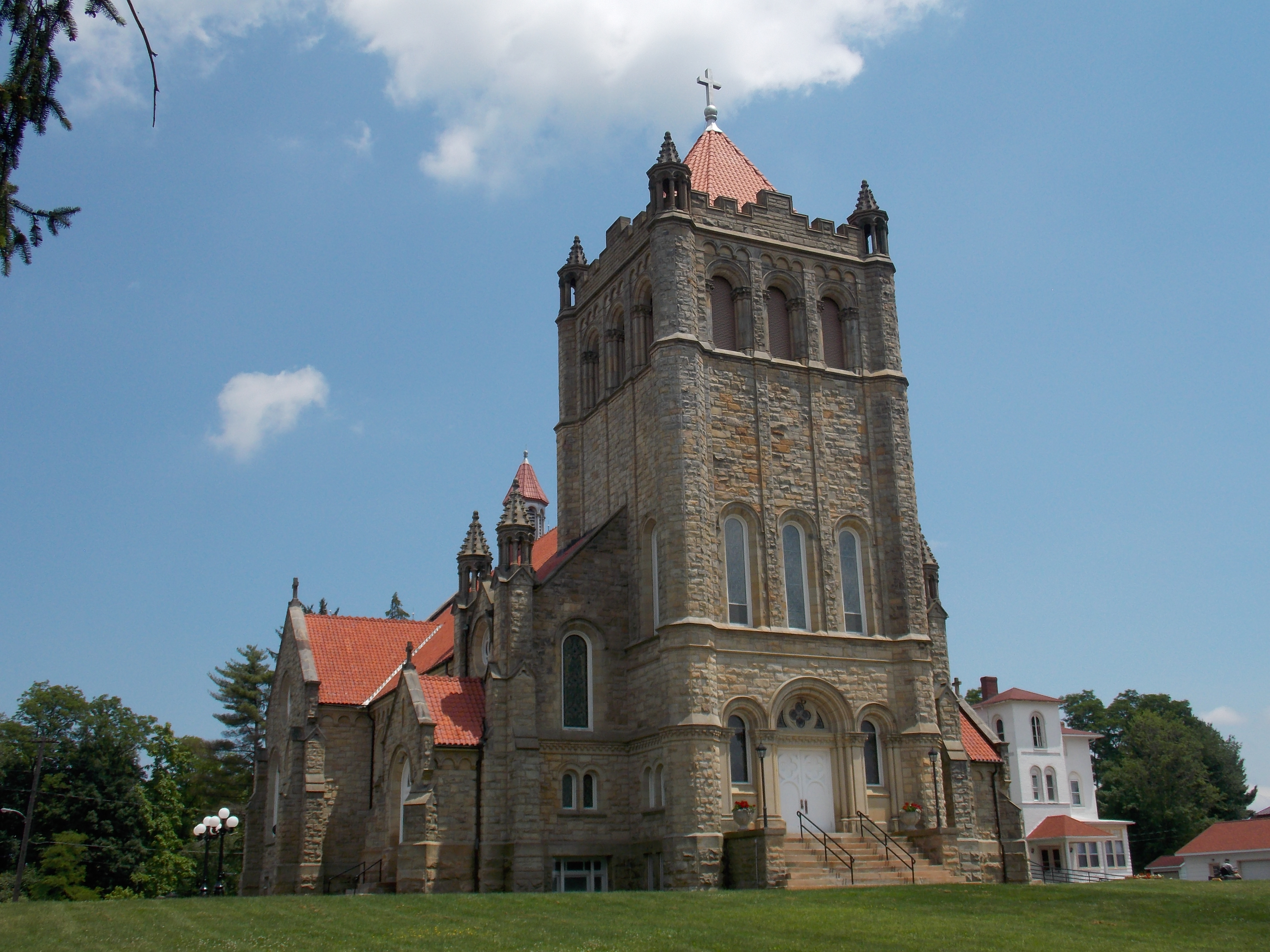
Basilica of St. Michael the Archangel

== History ==
Loretto was founded in 1799 by Demetrius Augustine Gallitzin as an English-speaking Catholic settlement west of the Allegheny Front. He named it after the town of Loreto, Italy, site of a Catholic place of pilgrimage. Loretto was built adjoining the original settlement founded by Captain Michael McGuire, a Revolutionary War veteran, in 1788. In his will, Captain McGuire donated land to the Catholic Church on which Prince Gallitzin built St. Michael's Church in 1799.

Federal Correctional Institution, Loretto, is a U.S. federal prison located 0.5 miles (0.80 km) southeast of Loretto, on the site of a former Catholic seminary.

== Demographics ==
Historical population
| Census | Pop. | Note | %± |
|---|---|---|---|
| 1850 | 193 | | — |
| 1860 | 256 | | 32.6% |
| 1870 | 280 | | 9.4% |
| 1880 | 280 | | 0.0% |
| 1890 | 236 | | −15.7% |
| 1900 | 240 | | 1.7% |
| 1910 | 246 | | 2.5% |
| 1920 | 422 | | 71.5% |
| 1930 | 352 | | −16.6% |
| 1940 | 504 | | 43.2% |
| 1950 | 863 | | 71.2% |
| 1960 | 1,338 | | 55.0% |
| 1970 | 1,661 | | 24.1% |
| 1980 | 1,395 | | −16.0% |
| 1990 | 1,072 | | −23.2% |
| 2000 | 1,190 | | 11.0% |
| 2010 | 1,302 | | 9.4% |
| 2020 | 1,196 | | −8.1% |

At the 2000 census there were 1,190 people, 133 households, and 82 families living in the borough. The population density was 1,167.3 people per square mile (450.7 people/km^{2}). There were 153 housing units at an average density of 150.1 per square mile (58.0/km^{2}). The racial makeup of the borough was 96.39% White, 2.52% African American, 0.50% Asian, 0.08% Pacific Islander, 0.25% from other races, and 0.25% from two or more races. Hispanic or Latino of any race were 1.26%.

There were 133 households, 21.8% had children under the age of 18 living with them, 51.1% were married couples living together, 6.0% had a female householder with no husband present, and 37.6% were non-families. 27.8% of households were made up of individuals, and 12.0% were one person aged 65 or older. The average household size was 2.52 and the average family size was 3.20.

The age distribution was 5.5% under the age of 18, 71.6% from 18 to 24, 8.7% from 25 to 44, 7.2% from 45 to 64, and 6.9% 65 or older. The median age was 21 years. For every 100 females there were 70.7 males. For every 100 females age 18 and over, there were 69.8 males. The median household income was $30,357 and the median family income was $40,750. Males had a median income of $30,417 versus $16,250 for females. The per capita income for the borough was $7,125. About 2.7% of families and 9.1% of the population were below the poverty line, including none of those under age 18 and 2.6% of those age 65 or over.

== Education ==
It is in the Penn Cambria School District.

== Notable people ==
- Demetrius Augustine Gallitzin, Apostle of the Alleghenies
- Charles M. Schwab, industrialist
