= Basilica of St. Michael the Archangel (Loretto, Pennsylvania) =

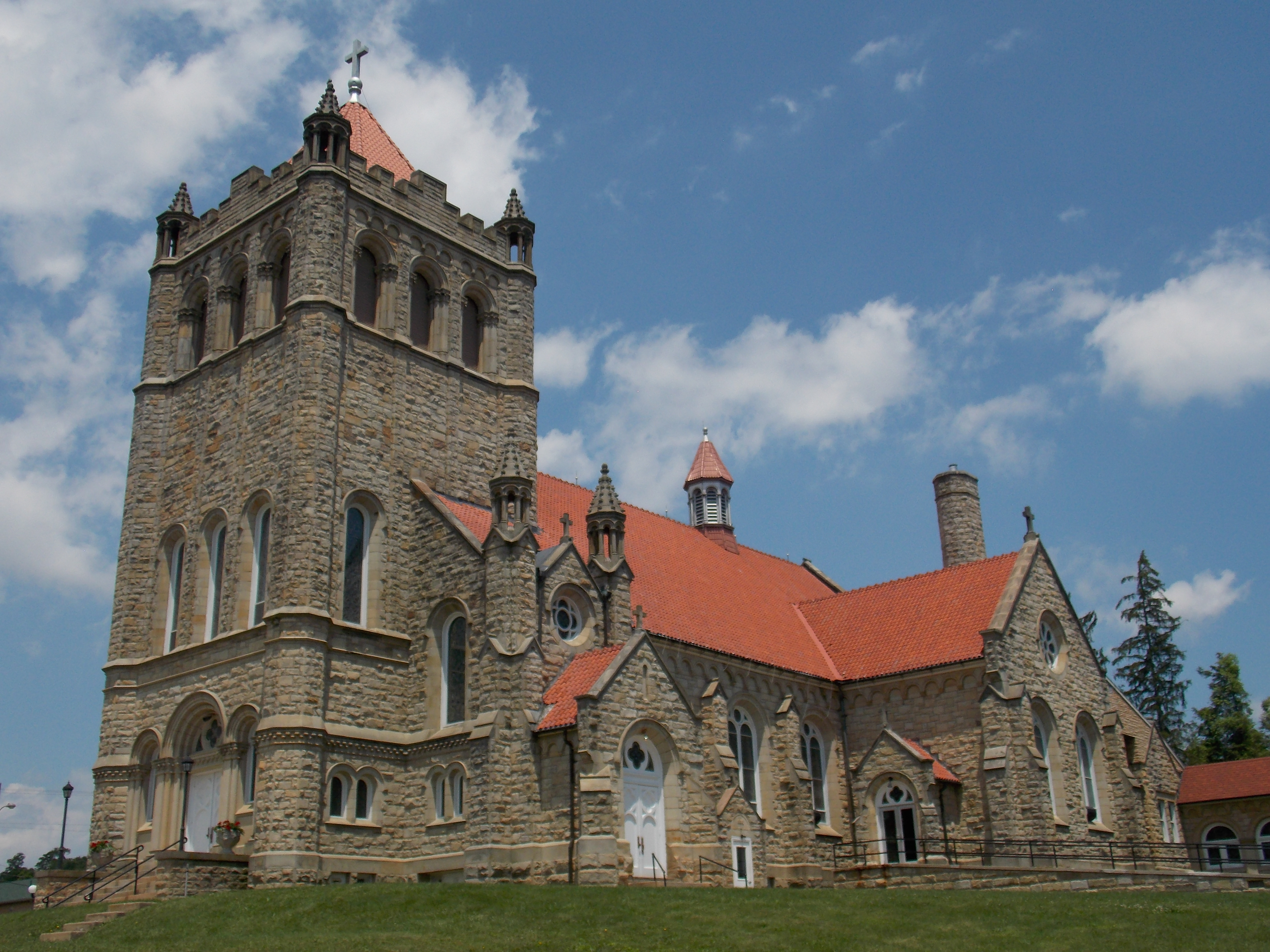

- Location in Pennsylvania
- 40°30′09″N 78°37′49″W
- Location: 321 St. Mary St. Loretto, Pennsylvania
- Country: United States
- Denomination: Catholic Church
- Website: www.basilicasm-loretto.org

History
- Founded: 1799
- Founder: Rev. Demetrius Gallitzin
- Consecrated: October 2, 1901

Architecture
- Architect: Frederick J. Osterling
- Style: Romanesque Revival
- Groundbreaking: January 10, 1900
- Completed: 1901
- Construction cost: $150,000

Specifications
- Materials: Sandstone

Administration
- Diocese: Altoona-Johnstown

Clergy
- Bishop: Most Rev. Mark L. Bartchak
- Rector: Very Rev. John D. Byrnes, JCL, JV, Rector

The Basilica of St. Michael the Archangel is a Minor Basilica of the Catholic Church located in Loretto, Pennsylvania, United States. It is also a parish church of the Diocese of Altoona-Johnstown.

== History ==
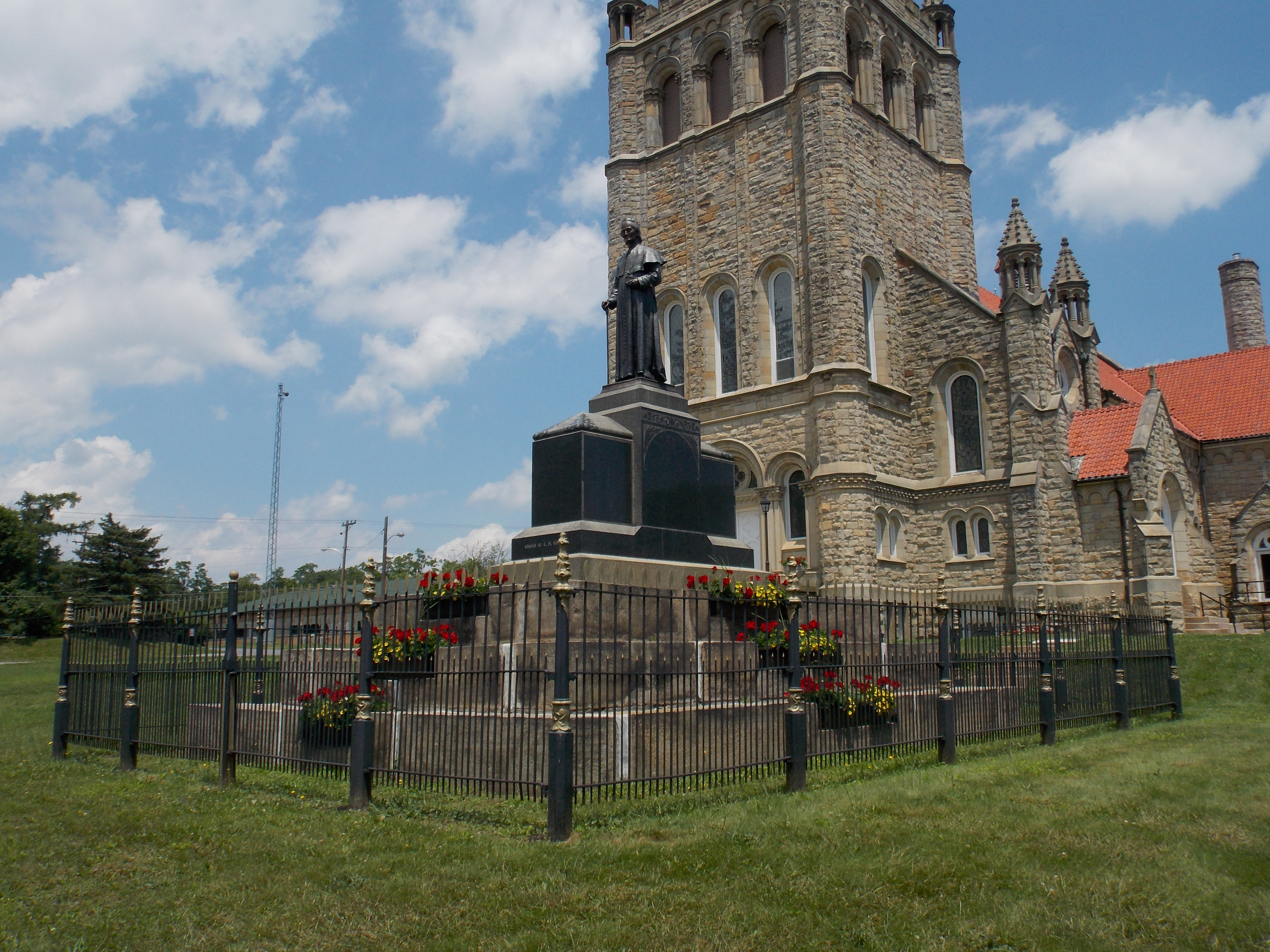
Demetrius Gallitzin grave

St. Michael's parish was founded by the Rev. Demetrius Gallitzin and it was named for the patron saint of Michael McGuire, who was the first settler in the area in 1788. The parish has had four different church buildings in its history. The first church was built of white pine logs in 1799. The second church was a frame structure built in 1817. The first and second church buildings were located in the same location on the western edge of the cemetery. The outline of the stone foundation of the second church can still be seen there. The third church was built of brick in 1854 where the present church is located.

Construction for the present church was begun on January 10, 1900. The stone for the foundation was quarried locally. The church was consecrated on October 2, 1901. The Romanesque Revival church was built at a cost of $150,000. It was designed by Frederick J. Osterling, and paid for by Charles M. Schwab, the president of United States Steel, who had spent his youth in Loretto. The three bells in the tower were donated by Mr. and Mrs. Charles Schwab, Mr. and Mrs. John Schwab and the Rev. Ferdinand Kittell, who was the pastor when the church was built. Andrew Carnegie donated the pipe organ for $8,000. Pope John Paul II decreed on September 9, 1996 that St. Michael's Church was elevated to the status of a minor basilica.

== Architecture ==
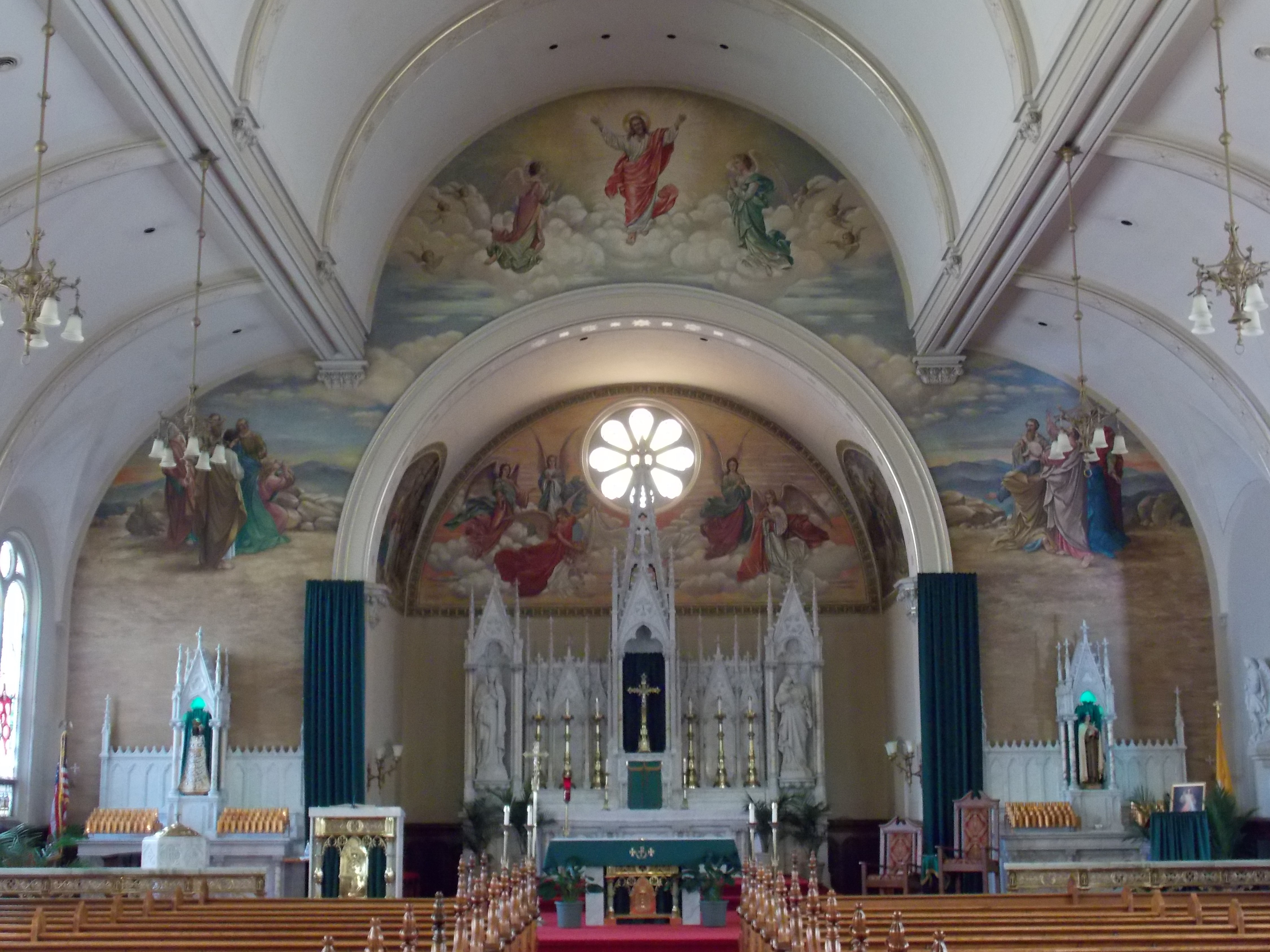
Basilica's interior

While the church was substantially designed in the Romanesque Revival style, there are some decorative elements in the Gothic Revival style. These include the altars, that were carved of Carrara marble and imported from Italy, and the altar rail that is composed of Mexican onyx and supported by brass pilasters, capitals and panels. The Stations of the Cross were also imported from Italy. The interior features three paintings over the Main Altar area. They were created by an artist from Chicago and depict the Ascension of Jesus, the Flight into Egypt, and the Nativity of Jesus. The wainscoting and the pews are both composed of red oak.
